= Domon Ken Award =

Japanese photography award

The Domon Ken Award (土門拳賞, Domon-Ken-shō) is one of Japan's photographic awards.

The award was started in 1981 by the Mainichi Newspapers to mark the 110th anniversary of the Mainichi Shimbun, its daily newspaper and main publication, in honor of the photographer Ken Domon. It has been awarded every year since 1982.

The Domon Ken Award is given to a single established photographer for a published book of documentary photographs. Together with sample photographs, an announcement is made in Sunday Mainichi (and previously in Camera Mainichi as well). Award-winning works are shown in the Ginza Nikon Salon and the Domon Ken Photography Museum.

The major rival to this award for attention in the mass media is the Kimura Ihei Award, given annually to one or more newcomers.

== Winners ==
Awards
	year	photographer
1	1982	Tadao Mitome
2	1983	Masatoshi Naitō
3	1984	Kazuyoshi Nomachi
4	1985	Tsuneo Enari
5	1986	Taku Aramasa
6	1987	Hiroshi Suga
7	1988	Takeshi Nishikawa
8	1989	Ichirō Tsuda
9	1990	Manabu Miyazaki
10	1991	Bishin Jumonji
11	1992	Kōichi Imaeda
12	1993	Hiromi Nagakura
13	1994	Yoshikazu Minami
14	1995	Kiyoshi Sumiyoshi
15	1996	Katsumi Sunamori
16	1997	Issei Suda
17	1998	Seiichi Motohashi
18	1999	Takeshi Mizukoshi
19	2000	Osamu Kanemura
20	2001	Yoshino Ōishi
21	2002	Toshiya Momose
22	2003	Ryūichi Hirokawa
23	2004	Hiroh Kikai
24	2005	Eiichirō Sakata
25	2006	Hideaki Uchiyama
26	2007	Ikuo Nakamura
27	2008	Hiromi Tsuchida
28	2009	Mitsuhiko Imamori
29	2010	Ryūichirō Suzuki
30	2011	Naoki Ishikawa
31	2012	Yutaka Takanashi
37	2018	Tokuko Ushioda
