= Kimura Ihei Award =

Japanese photography award

The Kimura Ihei Award (木村伊兵衛写真賞, Kimura Ihei Shashin-shō) is a Japanese photography award.

The award has been given every year since 1975 (except 1983) by the Asahi Shimbun Company, publisher of Asahi Shimbun and the magazine Asahi Camera, in honor of the photographer Ihei Kimura. It is given to one or more new photographers whose work has been exhibited or published during the previous year and is announced in Asahi Camera: its original name, soon shortened, was Asahi Kamera Kimura Ihei Shashin-shō (アサヒカメラ木村伊兵衛写真賞).

The award is usually given to a single photographer. In 2000, the unprecedented awarding of three prizes, each to a female photographer, caused a stir.

Its major rival for attention in the mass media is the Domon Ken Award, given annually to a single photographer, usually one with a longer career than those who win the Kimura Award.

== Winners ==
| year | photographer |
|---|---|
| 1975 | Kazuo Kitai |
| 1976 | Kōshichi Taira |
| 1977 | Shin'ya Fujiwara |
| 1978 | Miyako Ishiuchi |
| 1979 | Mitsuaki Iwagō |
| 1979 | Seiji Kurata |
| 1980 | Tsuneo Enari |
| 1981 | Kanendo Watanabe |
| 1982 | Keizō Kitajima |
| 1983 | (no award) |
| 1984 | Keiichi Tahara |
| 1985 | Kazuyoshi Miyoshi |
| 1986 | Hisashi Wada |
| 1987 | Ikuo Nakamura |
| 1988 | Ryūji Miyamoto |
| 1989 | Hana Takeda |
| 1989 | Michio Hoshino |
| 1990 | Michiko Kon |
| 1991 | Toshio Shibata |
| 1992 | Mitsugu Ōnishi |
| 1992 | Norio Kobayashi |
| 1993 | Yasuhisa Toyohara |
| 1994 | Mitsuhiko Imamori |
| 1995 | Masato Seto |
| 1996 | Naoya Hatakeyama |
| 1997 | Kyōichi Tsuzuki |
| 1998 | Takashi Homma |
| 1999 | Risaku Suzuki |
| 2000 | Yurie Nagashima |
| 2000 | Hiromix |
| 2000 | Mika Ninagawa |
| 2001 | Taiji Matsue |
| 2001 | Rinko Kawauchi (for the books Utatane and Hanabi) |
| 2002 | Yuki Onodera |
| 2002 | Masafumi Sanai |
| 2003 | Tomoko Sawada |
| 2004 | Masataka Nakano (for the book Tokyo Windows) |
| 2005 | Ryūdai Takano (for the book How to Contact a Man) |
| 2006 | Naoki Honjō (for the book small planet) |
| 2006 | Kayo Ume (for the book Ume-me) |
| 2007 | Atsushi Okada (for the book I am) |
| 2007 | Lieko Shiga (for the books Lilly and Canary) |
| 2008 | Masashi Asada (for the book Asadake) |
| 2009 | Cozue Takagi (for the books Mid and Ground) |
| 2010 | Eiko Shimozono (for the book Kizuna) |
| 2011 | Masaru Tatsuki (for the book Tohoku) |
| 2012 | Arata Dodo (for the book Taigan) |
| 2012 | Tomoko Kikuchi (for the exhibition I and I) |
| 2013 | Eiki Mori (for the book intimacy) |
| 2014 | Ryūichi Ishikawa (for the books Zekkei no Polyphony and okinawan portraits 2010-2012) |
| 2014 | Kotori Kawashima (for the book Myōjō) |
| 2015 | Takashi Arai (for the book Monuments) |
| 2016 | Mikiko Hara (for the book Change) |
| 2017 | Hiroko Komatsu (for the exhibition Jinkakuteki jiritsu shori and others) |
| 2017 | Aya Fujioka (for the book Kawa wa yuku and others) |
| 2018 | Ai Iwane (for the book Kipuka and the exhibition Fukushima Ondo) |
| 2019 | Mari Katayama (for the book GIFT and the exhibition May You Live in Interesting Times at the 58th Venice Biennale) |
| 2019 | Daisuke Yokota (for the book Sediment and the exhibition Room. Pt. 1) |

== Bibliography ==
- (in Japanese) Kimura Ihei Shashinshō no nijūnen (木村伊兵衛写真賞の20年, "20 years of the Kimura Ihei Award". Mōru, 1995. ISBN 4-938628-17-1. With sample photographs from each of the award-winners (more from each of them than appear in the later, thirty-year compilation).
- (in Japanese) Kimura Ihei Shashinshō no kiseki: 1975–1999 (木村伊兵衛写真賞の奇跡：1975–1999, "Remains of the Kimura Ihei Award: 1975–1999"). An exhibition catalogue.
- (in Japanese) Sanjūroku fotogurafāzu: Kimura Ihei Shashinshō no sanjūnen (36フォトグラファーズ：木村伊兵衛写真賞の30年, "36 photographers: 30 years of the Kimura Ihei Award"). Tokyo: Asahi Shinbun, 2005. ISBN 4-02-272303-3. With sample photographs from each of the award-winners.
