= Fusako Kodama =

Japanese photographer

Fusako Kodama (児玉 房子, Kodama Fusako, born 1945) is a Japanese photographer who has concentrated on people in cities as subjects.

== Life and career ==
Kodama was born in Wakayama City (Wakayama Prefecture, Japan) in 1945. She graduated from Kuwasawa Design School in 1967. She then worked as a photographer for a company named Le Mars (ル・マルス).

In 1990 Grafication, a PR magazine of Fuji Xerox, published a series of pieces by Kodama that were later collected into her first photobook, Criteria. With its depiction of nuclear power plants and other scenes of advanced technology, this book was widely noted as a remarkable document.

This was followed by depictions of street life in the metropolis, in the photobook Tokyo Kinetic and various exhibitions. In 1993, Kodama won the Annual Award of the Photographic Society of Japan. From April 1993 to March 1995, the magazine Asahi Camera ran a series by her, Tokyo Cruising.

== Exhibitions ==
=== Solo exhibitions ===
- Kuraiteria (クライテリア) / Criteria.
- Tōkyō Kinetikku (東京キネティック). Ginza Nikon Salon, 1992.
- Tokyo Photographs
- Hanazakari no koro: Machi no hitobito (花ざかりの頃・街の人々)
- Tōkyō kōgai (東京郊外). Gallery Art Graph, 1997.
- Kibō no genzai 「希望」の現在). Osaka Nikon Salon, July 2007.

=== Group exhibitions ===
- 11-nin no Itaria, Nihon no shashinka-ten (11人のイタリア・日本の写真家展). Istituto Italiano di Cultura di Tokyo.
- About Big Cities. Neue Gesellschaft für Bildende Kunst (Berlin), 1993.
- Josei-shashinka no manazashi, 1945–1997 (女性写真家のまなざし 1945〜1997). Tokyo Metropolitan Museum of Photography, 1998.

== Collections ==
The Tokyo Metropolitan Museum of Photography possesses twenty prints by Kodama of Tokyo and Tokyo Bay, dating from 1970 to 1977.

== Books by Kodama ==
- Kuraiteria: Kodama Fusako shashinshū (クライテリア 児玉房子写真集) / Criteria. Tokyo: IPC, 1990. ISBN 4871988295. Color photographs, captions and text in both Japanese and English. Japan as a high-tech society. (Eleven of the photographs are of the Fukushima No. 2 nuclear power plant.)
- Sennen-go niwa: Tōkyō: Kodama Fusako shashinshū (千年後には・東京 児玉房子写真集) / Tokyo Kinetic. Tokyo: Gendai Shokan, 1992. ISBN 4768477194. Black and white views of Tokyo; text in Japanese only.

== Video ==
Together with Miho Akioka, Miyako Ishiuchi, Yuri Nagahara, Hiroko Matsuo and Michiko Matsumoto, Kodama is interviewed within the video 6 works and 6 artists.
