= Eiki (given name) =

Eiki is a given name. Notable people with the given name include:

- Eiki Berg (born 1970), Estonian scientist, professor, and politician
- Eiki Eiki, the professional name of Eiko Naitō (born 1971), Japanese manga artist
- Eiki Kitamura (born 1981), Japanese actor
- Eiki Matayoshi (born 1947), Japanese contemporary writer
- Eiki Miyazaki (born 1955), Japanese equestrian
- Eiki Mori (born 1976), Japanese photographer
- Eiki Nestor (born 1953), Estonian politician
- Eiki Takahashi (born 1992), Japanese racewalker
