= Tokuko Ushioda =

Japanese photographer

Tokuko Ushioda (潮田登久子, Ushioda Tokuko, b. 1940) is a Japanese photographer whose Bibliotecha series won the Domon Ken Award, the Photographic Society of Japan’s Lifetime Achievement Award, and the Higashikawa International Photo Festival's Domestic Photographer Award in 2018.

Ushioda has works in the collections of Smith College Museum of Art in Massachusetts; Mead Art Museum of Amherst College, Kyushu Sangyō University, Fukuoka, Japan; the National Museum of Modern Art, Tokyo, Japan; Tokyo Photographic Art Museum, Tokyo, Japan; Ken Domon Museum of Photography, Yamagata, Japan; and Higashikawa Town, Hokkaido, Japan.

== Career ==
Ushioda was born in Tokyo, Japan, in 1940.

She studied under Ōtsuji Kiyoji at Kuwasawa Design School and graduated in 1963. She also studied under Yasuhiro Ishimoto. She has worked as a freelance photographer since 1975, and taught at Kuwasawa Design School and Tokyo Zōkei University from 1966-1978. She married photographer Shinzō Shimao in 1978, and their daughter is the manga artist and illustrator Maho Shimao.

Ushioda is perhaps best known for her series Bibliotecha (Hon no keshiki, 本の景色), for which she photographed books as valid art objects in 1995. She published the photobook Bibliotecha in 2017, dividing the images into 26 chapters that show books beyond their presence as mere physical objects.

Ushioda is also known for her series ICE BOX (Reizōko, 冷蔵庫), in which she photographed the contents of various families' refrigerators. She published the photobook ICE BOX in 1996, depicting compositions of many refrigerators captured open with the contents inside, or closed from the front, as well as in various settings within the households.

Her series My Husband (Mai hazubando, マイハズバンド) "chronicles Ushioda’s family life and artistic growth" during the 1970s. The artist found the prints forty years later in March 2020, leading to the publication of a two-part photobook in 2022.

== Publications ==
- My Husband, Torch Press, 2022
- BIBLIOTHECA, Genkishobou, 2017
- My Teacher’s Atelier, Genkishobou 2017
- Misuzu, Genkishobou, 2016
- HATS, Parol, 2004
- ICE BOX, Beebooks, 1996
- Chinese People, Self-published, 1986

== Awards ==
- 2019 Kuwasawa Special Award
- 2018 The 37th Domon Ken Award
- 2018 Lifetime Achievement Award, Photographic Society of Japan Awards
- 2018 Domestic Photographer Award, The 34th Higashikawa Awards

== Exhibition History ==
=== Selected Solo Exhibitions ===
- 1976 Hohoemi no tejo/Smile was handcuffed, Shinjuku Nikon Salon, Tokyo
- 1989 Seikatsu/LIFE, Film Round Gallery, Tokyo
- 1992 ICE BOX, Tokyo Design Center, Tokyo
- 1994 HATS, Gallery MOLE, Tokyo
- 1998 ICE BOX, Art Gallery Artium, Tokyo
- 1999 ICE BOX, Setagaya Lifestyle Design Center, Tokyo
- 2001 HATS, Contemporary Photo Gallery, Tokyo
- 2002 Seika/Sacred Song, Contemporary Photo Gallery, Tokyo
- 2003 BIBLIOTHECA, The 5th Library Fair at Tokyo International Forum
- 2003 BIBLIOTHECA, Contemporary Photo Gallery, Tokyo
- 2003 BIBLIOTHECA, Waseda University Library, Tokyo
- 2004 Bookmart, Contemporary Photo Gallery, Tokyo
- 2006 BIBLIOTHECA, Imbrie Hall Meiji Gakuin University, Tokyo
- 2008 ICE BOX, Port Gallery T, Osaka
- 2009 ICE BOX, CAFÉ UNIZON, Okinawa
- 2010 BIBLIOTHECA, Morioka Shoten, Tokyo
- 2017 BIBLIOTHECA, Galerie 412, Tokyo
- 2017 BIBLIOTHECA, PGI, Tokyo
- 2018 Domon Ken Award Winner's Exhibition, BIBLIOTHECA, The Gallery, Nikon Plaza (Shinjuku, Osaka)
- 2018 Domon Ken Award Winner's Exhibition, BIBLIOTHECA, Ken Domon Museum of Photography (Yamagata)

=== Selected Group Exhibitions ===
- 1981 Jinwa Jinminkosha, OWL, Tokyo
- 1982 China Life Report, Polaroid Gallery, Tokyo
- 1989 6・un・expressionism, FROG, Tokyo
- 1995 Tokyo/City of Photo, Tokyo Metropolitan Museum of Photography, Tokyo
- 2004 Maho-chan-chi (Maho-chan’s Lovely Home), Contemporary Art Gallery, Art Tower Mito, Ibaraki
- 2008 China/Bibliotheca/Manga, Lee Ka-sing Gallery, Toronto, Canada
- 2012 Reinventing Tokyo, Mead Art Museum, Amherst College, Amherst, MA
- 2015 The Kaji House, Hayama, Kanagawa
- 2016 Dislocations, Smith College Museum of Art, Northampton, MA
- 2018 A Moveable Feast, Xian Memories Museum, Xian, China
- 2018 The Photographic Society of Japan Awards, Winner’s Exhibition, Fujifilm Square, Tokyo
- 2018 The Higashikawa Awards, Award Winning Exhibition, Higashikawa Bunka Gallery, Hokkaido
- 2019 A Bright Home, Hiroshima City Museum of Contemporary Art, Hiroshima
- 2021 Anneke Hymmen & Kumi Hiroi, Tokuko Ushioda, Mari Katayama, Maiko Haruki, Mayumi Hosokura, and Your Perspectives, Shiseido Gallery, Tokyo
- 2022 From Student to Master: Tokuko Ushioda and Her Teachers, Alison Bradley Projects, New York
