= Koji Sato =

Koji Sato or Kōji Satō may refer to:

- Koji Sato (actor) in live adaptation of Dive!!
- Kōji Satō (photographer) (1911–1955), Japanese photographer
- Koji Sato (politician) (佐藤 公治; born 1959), Japanese politician
- Koji Sato (engineer), Toyota CEO (April 2023 - March 2026)
