= Eiichi =

- Gender: Male

Origin
- Origin: Japanese
- Meaning: Different meanings depending on the kanji used

Eiichi (written: 暎一, 栄一, 英一, 詠一 or 映一) is a masculine Japanese given name. Notable people with the name include:

- Eiichi Fukui (福井 英一; 1921–1954), Japanese manga artist
- Eiichi Goto (後藤 英一; 1931–2005), Japanese computer scientist
- Eiichi Itai (born 1951), Japanese golfer
- Iwashita Eiichi (岩下 栄一; 1955–1999), Japanese sumo wrestler
- Eiichi Kazama (風間 栄一; 1916–2001), Japanese sport wrestler
- Eiichi Kikuchi (菊池 英一; born 1942), Japanese actor
- Eiichi Koyano (小谷野 栄一; born 1980), Japanese baseball player
- Eiichi Kudo (工藤 栄一; 1929–2000), Japanese film director
- Eiichi Matsumoto (松本 栄一; 1915–2004), Japanese photographer
- Eiichi Moriwaki (森脇 英一), Japanese photographer
- Eiichi Miyazato (宮里 栄一; 1922–1999), Japanese karateka and judoka
- Eiichi Nakamura (chemist) (中村 栄一; born 1951), Japanese chemist and academic
- Eiichi Nakamura (field hockey) (中村 栄一; 1909–1945), Japanese field hockey player
- Eiichi Nakao (中尾 栄一; born 1930), Japanese politician
- Ei-ichi Negishi (根岸 英一; born 1935), Japanese chemist
- Eiichi Ohtaki (大瀧 詠一; born 1948–2013), Japanese musician
- Eiichi Sakurai (桜井 栄一; 1909–1998), Japanese photographer
- Eiichi Sato (佐藤 栄一; born 1961), Japanese politician
- Shibusawa Eiichi (渋沢 栄一; 1840–1931), Japanese businessman
- Eiichi Sugimoto (杉本 栄一; 1901–1952), Japanese economist and academic
- Eiichi Tanaka (田中 英一; born 1941), Japanese Nordic combined skier
- Eiichi Uemura (植村 映一; born 1975), Japanese footballer
- Eiichi Yamamoto (山本 暎一; born 1940), Japanese film director and screenwriter
- Eiichi Yamashita (山下 栄一; born 1947), Japanese politician

== Fictional characters ==
- Eiichi Kite, fictional character from Kiteretsu Daihyakka
- Eichi Tenshouin, fictional character from Ensemble Stars!
