= Tomohiro Okada =

Japanese art curator

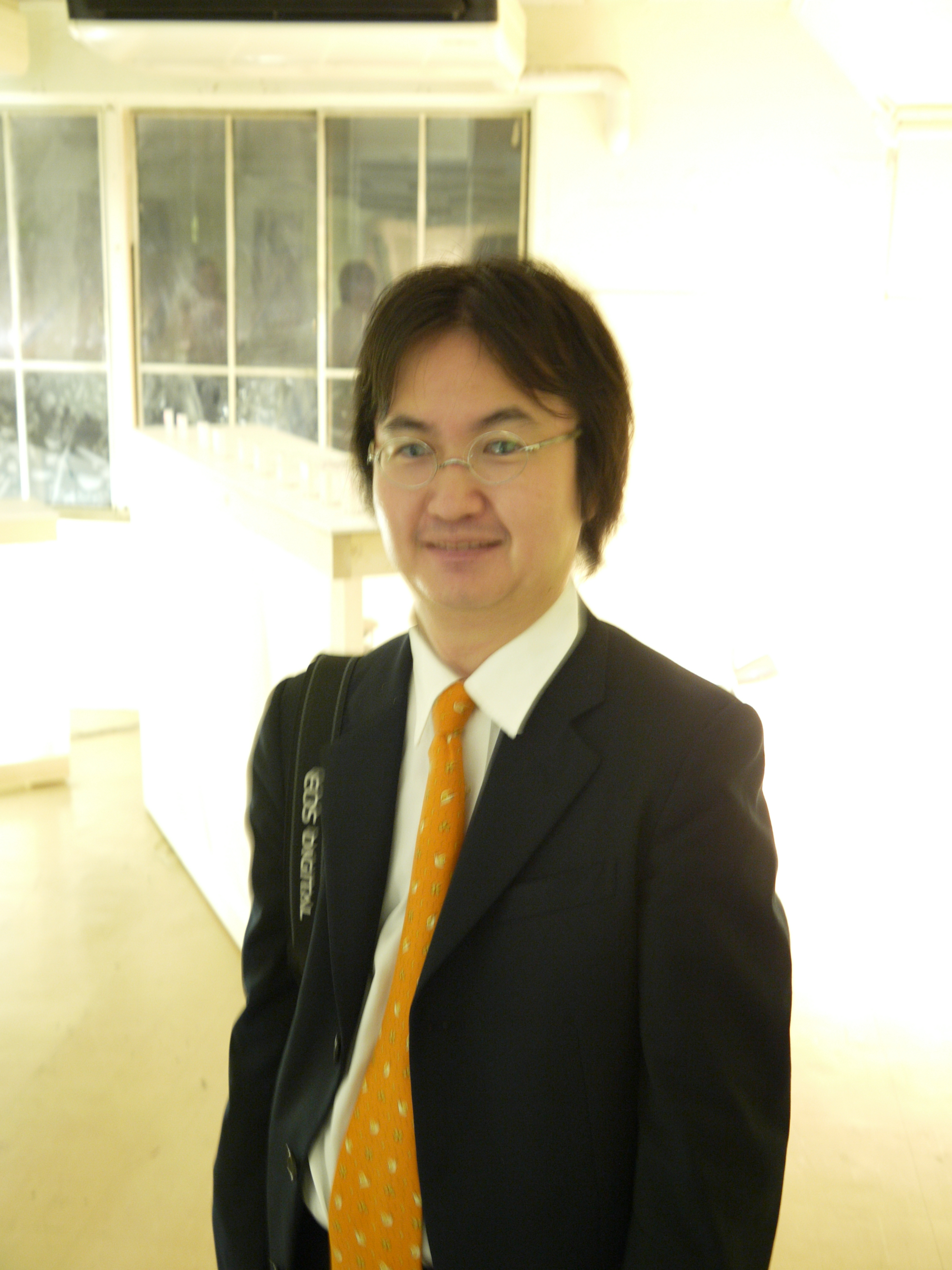
Tomohiro Okada in July 2008

Tomohiro Okada (岡田智博) is an interdisciplinary creative and innovation developer, researcher, policymaker, and art curator of contemporary and technology field, Director of Creative Cluster. Since 1995 he has been active in electronic media and creative innovation in Japan especially promoting young talent in new media art, interaction design as a researcher, producer, curator, writer and organizer of numerous creative productions, and policy designs for government and institutions for economic and industry and culture affairs. He has written various policy papers for art and creative and civil development of various local governments and agencies, lectured and held positions at various universities, participated in conferences and symposia, and has worked as a consultant.

As a curator and producer Tomohiro OKADA created Fantasista series (2005 – Evolution Cafe, Electrical Fantasista, Creative Fantasista), an independent new talent media art and design exhibition, certification of "Emerging people in the field of Media Arts - 2010. Agency for Cultural Affairs (JAPAN)", "Cultural Promoting Project – 2010 (Fine art). Tokyo Metropolitan Government". Tokyo Art Beat magazine signed most wanted art show in Tokyo, 2008 summer, by online reader voting, Super Robot Exhibition (2014, 2015) were hundreds of global media coverages introducing robotic art and design in Japan, also promoting new media and digital art talents thorough out of his curating and management works such as shown first art show at public art venue of TeamLab and Yoichi Ochiai, and contributing to promote Media Arts in Japan region by Japan Media Arts Festival exhibition (2010, 2017, 2019) as a director, Agency of Cultural Affair.

== Biography ==
Tomohiro OKADA is PhD of Tokyo University of the Arts in Arts Policy and Creative Industries and Innovation, graduated from The University of Tokyo with M.A. in information studies, and Kyushu Institute of Design with M.S. in visual art and design studies.

He has been the director of non-profit new media culture and social development nationwide initiative, Creative Cluster Institute, based in Tokyo, Okinawa, Kyoto.

He is also teaching Art Critics after 20th Century, Creative Economics, and Creative and Art Management at Associate Professor at Tokyo Polytechnic University (2026-), and Hitotsubashi University (2025-2026), Tokyo University of Arts (2021-2026), Aoyama Gakuin University (Under Grad and Grad, 2019-2024), Osaka City University (2019-2026), Komazawa University (2008–2017), Atomi University (Tokyo) as a lecturer, and Center of Creative City at Osaka City University as a researcher.

== Projects ==
- 2001 Ars Electronica 2001 takeover - A concept making for festival logo
- Global Media -OTAKU- (Tokyo Metropolitan Museum of Photography), a coordinator and researcher
- 2005 Evolution Cafe, Exhibition of emerging media art and design, held in Yokohama, Japan - Producer and curator
- 2006, 2008 Electrical Fantasista, International exhibition of emerging media art and design, held in Yokohama, Japan - Producer and curator
- 2007 Yokohama EIZONE, a creative festival by City of Yokohama - A curator for media art experiment "Digital Art Cool Summer"
- 2008 Y Innovation
- 2009 Media Arts in the World Mapping, Information mapping for 12th Japan Media Arts Festival Exhibition - A researcher and editor
- 2009 Creative Cafe OSAKA
- 2010 Japan Media Arts Festival, Sapporo Exhibition (Director)
- 2011 Creative Fantasista
- 2014 Super Robot Exhibition (on Tokyo Designers Week EXPO 2014)
- 2017 Japan Media Arts Festival, Ishigaki-jima Island Exhibition (Director)
- 2018 "Culture and Tourism Development Plan," City of Ishigaki (Management and Editrial)
- 2019 SHIMANOVA シマノバ Creative Center, Ishigaki, Okinawa (Director)
- 2019 Japan Media Arts Festival, Otalu Exhibition (Director)
- 2021- Akigawa Art Stream. West Tama Region, Tokyo (Director)
