= Cozue Takagi =

Japanese photographer

Cozue Takagi (高木こずえ, Takagi Kozue) is a Japanese photographer.

== Biography ==
Cozue Takagi was born in Nagano in 1985. She graduated from the photography department of Tokyo Polytechnic University in 2007.

In 2006 she won the Daido Moriyama Award and the second prize at the Epson Color Imaging Contest for her series Selfcounseling. In 2009 she was awarded the prestigious Kimura Ihei Award.

== Books ==
- MID. Akaaka Art Publishing, 2009.
- Ground. Akaaka Art Publishing, 2009.
- Suzu The Shinano Mainichi Shimbun Inc., 2011.
