= Seiji Kurata =

Japanese photographer (1945–2020)

Seiji Kurata (倉田精二, Kurata Seiji; 1945 - 27 February 2020) was a Japanese photographer.

== Career ==
Kurata was born in Chūō-ku, Tokyo, 1945. He graduated from the Tokyo National University of Fine Arts and Music in 1968. He taught in secondary school and worked in oils, printmaking, and experimental movies. He practised under Daidō Moriyama in an independent photography workshop in 1976.

Kurata won the fifth Kimura Ihei Award in 1980 for his first book, Flash Up. For the black-and-white photographs here, Kurata used flash and a medium format camera, resulting in a detailed portrait of a world of bōsōzoku, gangsters, rightists, strippers, transvestites, and so on: as Parr and Badger point out, these are old subjects; but in his "highly polished, detailed" work, Kurata "has an unerring instinct for pictures that suggest stories". Photo Cabaret and 80's Family continued in this direction. This Japanese work of Kurata's is anthologized in his later volume Japan. Kurata won the PSJ award in 1992. A long stay in Mongolia in 1994 led to the book Toransu Ajia, which continued color work of the Asian mainland started with Dai-Ajia. In 1999 Kurata's book Japan won the Kodansha Publishing Culture Award (講談社出版文化賞) for a work of photography. Prints of Kurata's photographs are in the permanent collections of ICP (New York), the Brooklyn Museum, and the Tokyo Metropolitan Museum of Photography.

He died on 27 February 2020.

== Solo exhibitions ==
- ストリートフォトランダム東京 "Street Photo Random Tokyo 1975–79". Nikon Salon, Tokyo and Osaka, 1979.
- フォトキャバレー "Photo Cabaret". Doi Photo Plaza, Shibuya, Tokyo, 1983.
- ストリートフォトランダム東京II "Street Photo Random Tokyo 2". Nikon Salon, Tokyo, 1986.
- 大亜細亜 "Great Asia". Minolta Photo Space, Shinjuku, Tokyo, 1990.
- "Quest for Eros" I. Mole, Tokyo, 1993.
- トランスアジア "Trans Asia". Nikon Salon, Tokyo; Visual Arts School, Osaka, 1995.
- "Tokyo: Theatrical Megalopolis". O. K. Harris Gallery, New York, 1995.
- トランスマーケット＝東京神田青果市場をゆく "Trans Market: Tokyo Kanda vegetable and fruit market". Nikon Salon, Tokyo and Osaka, 1996.
- ジャパン70年代から90年代へ Japan from the 70s to the 90s. Kodak Photo Salon, Tokyo, 1999.
- "Quest for Eros" II. Galleria Prova, Tokyo, 1999.
- 都市の造景. Epsite, Tokyo, 2008.
- アンコール・都市の造景 B&W篇. Gallery Punctum, Tokyo, 2009.
- "Trans Asia, again!" Place M, Tokyo, 2013.

== Publications by Kurata ==
Following a title in Japanese script, an italicized roman-letter title is one provided on or in the book itself; a non-italicized roman-letter title is a mere gloss of the original title.

- Flash Up: Street Photo Random Tokyo 1975–1979. Tokyo: Byakuya Shobō, 1980. Black-and-white photographs. Includes one essay in English but also several in Japanese only; the captions too are only in Japanese.
- Foto Kyabarē (フォト・キャバレー) / Photo Cabaret. Tokyo: Byakuya Shobō, 1982. ISBN 978-4-938256-39-5. Black-and-white photographs of Japan. Text in Japanese only.
- Dai-Ajia (大亜細亜, Great Asia). Tokyo: IBC, 1990. ISBN 4-87198-807-4.
- 80's Family: Street Photo Random Japan. Tokyo: JICC Shuppankyoku, 1991. ISBN 4-7966-0079-5. Black-and-white and colour photographs of Japan. Text in Japanese only.
- Toransu-Ajia (トランスアジア, Trans-Asia). Tokyo: Ōta Shuppan, 1995. ISBN 4-87233-218-0.
- Japan (ジャパン) / Japan. Tokyo: Shinchōsha, Photo Musée, 1998. ISBN 4-10-602433-0. The captions are in English.
- Kuesuto fō Erosu (クエスト・フォー・エロス) / Quest for Eros. Tokyo: Shinchōsha, 1998. ISBN 4-10-430201-5.
- Trans Asia, again! Tokyo: Place M, 2013. ISBN 978-4-905360-08-7. Zine, published on the occasion of an exhibition at Place M of the same title.
- Flash Up. Tokyo: Zen Foto Gallery, 2013.
- Toshi no zōkei (都市の造景). Kamakura: Super Labo, 2015. ISBN 978-4-905052-86-9. (Note: Super Labo's page about the booklet is here.)

== Links and sources ==
- (in Japanese) Iizawa Kōtarō. Tōkyō shashin (東京写真) / Tokyo Photography. Tokyo: Inax, 1995. ISBN 4-87275-059-4. Despite the English subtitle, all in Japanese. Photographs by and essays on Kineo Kuwabara, William Klein, Masatoshi Naitō, Shigeo Gochō, Nobuyoshi Araki, Daidō Moriyama, Ryūji Miyamoto, Kyōichi Tsuzuki, and Yurie Nagashima, as well as Kurata.
- (in Japanese) Profile at TPO Photo School.
- (in Japanese) Review of Toransu-Ajia.
- Ono, Philbert. "Kurata Seiji". Brief note at PhotoGuide Japan.
- Parr, Martin, and Gerry Badger. The Photobook 1. London: Phaidon, 2004. ISBN 0-7148-4285-0.
- (in Japanese) Sanjūroku fotogurafāzu: Kimura Ihei Shashinshō no sanjūnen (36フォトグラファーズ：木村伊兵衛写真賞の30年, 36 photographers: 30 years of the Kimura Ihei Award). Tokyo: Asahi Shinbun, 2005. ISBN 4-02-272303-3. With sample photographs from each of the award-winners.
- (in Japanese) Shashinshū o yomu: Besuto 338 kanzen gaido (写真集を読む：ベスト338完全ガイド, Reading photobooks: A complete guide to the best 338). Tokyo: Metarōgu, 1997. ISBN 4-8398-2010-4. P.172. Review of 80's Family.
