= Takashi Arai =

Japanese photographer

Takashi Arai (born June 5, 1978) is a Japanese photographer/visual artist who is well known for his unique practice in contemporary daguerreotype. He is based in Kawasaki & Tono, Japan.

== Biography ==
Arai started University as a student of biology, and encountered photography for the first time there. He encountered the daguerreotype in a search to trace photography back to its roots, and dedicated the time and effort necessary to master the complex technique behind it.

According to Arai, he does not view the daguerreotype as a piece of nostalgia used to harken back to the days of a classical method. He has taken the daguerreotype on as his own personal medium, saying that he finds it "a reliable device for storing memory that is far better for recording and transmitting interactions with his subjects than modern photography."

Beginning in 2010, when he first became interested in nuclear issues, Arai has used the daguerreotype technique to create individual records—micro-monuments—of his encounters with people, objects, and places that had been through or affected by nuclear events. The first of these events was the Daigo Fukuryū Maru fishing boat, a vessel that was affected by nuclear fallout from the US's thermonuclear weapon test at Bikini Atoll in 1954. Called Castle Bravo, the thermonuclear weapons test occurred on March 1, 1954. The boat was contaminated by the fallout from the test, and the crew of 23 men aboard the ship suffered from acute radiation syndrome for weeks after the test. The crew was fishing outside of the danger zone that the US had declared beforehand, but the test was twice as powerful than anticipated; which put the crew in harm's way. The fallout reached the ship two hours after the explosion. The crew had attempted to escape; but in taking the time to retrieve their gear, they had exposed themselves to the radioactive fallout for several hours. They were treated, and during the course of treatment they were infected with hepatitis via blood transfusions. All except for the chief radioman of the ship recovered; as he had underlying health issues that were exacerbated by the hepatitis infection. As more information about the blast was obtained, it was estimated that a total of over one hundred other fishing vessels were affected.2 Arai began to document what he could– mainly encounters with surviving crew members and the salvaged hull.

This project led him to photograph the deeply interconnected subjects of Fukushima, Hiroshima, and Nagasaki. After 2011 Tōhoku earthquake and tsunami he often visited Fukushima and depicted the aftermath of the triple disaster.

The product of these ventures can be seen in two of his major projects. Here and There – Tomorrow's Islands, a series of documentary-style daguerreotypes that he created in Fukushima after the triple disaster there in 2011. This project stands out from others he has done, as this addresses a nuclear event that occurred during his lifetime, whereas other nuclear events he has had as the subject of his work (like the Daigo Fukuryu Maru) are significantly older. Exposed in a Hundred Suns takes on the idea in a different way. This series is a series of historical monuments in the Atomic Age; including work addressing the Daigo Fukuryu Maru. The project focuses on the surface of objects that have been exposed to events (like the Fukuryu Maru) and subsequently altered because of that; ultimately trying to allow people to discover their connection to these events, and create an opportunity to share the memories of those who may have experienced it.

Another project similar in concept, but not in medium, to the two previously mentioned project is Arai's 49 Pumpkins. Originally commissioned by Artpace San Antonio, 49 Pumpkins is a short film that addressing a series of events following the bombing of Hiroshima. For context, a year after the atomic bomb was dropped on Hiroshima, an oddly large number if pumpkins were harvested in Hiroshima. 49 "pumpkin bombs" –– dummy atomic bombs –– were dropped in 49 locations that would have been targeted if Japan had not surrendered. This was the basis of the project, and the original plan had been to charter a North American B-25 Mitchell to actually drop pumpkin "bombs" (which would have been 49 real pumpkins).

His other major projects include Tomorrow's History. This is a collection of daguerreotype portraits of teenagers from historically stigmatized teenagers, which was then coupled with an interview of the subject of the photograph. The Daily Daguerreotype Project is Arai's ongoing project that started in 2011. It as originally housed on Arai's website, but has since moved to Instagram. Rather than being on an Instagram account under Arai's name, it is housed on an account named daily_dag with his name and website link the bio. His short description of the project in the bio reads "Daily daguerreotype practice and ambient sounds during exposures since 2011." Photos from before the move to Instagram are still housed on Arai's website under a tab called "Daily D-type Project" . As fitting for the description, the Daily Daguerreotype Project does not have a consistent choice of subject–– the subjects range from people, to flowers, to landscapes.

== Collections and exhibits ==
Arai's work has appeared in numerous exhibitions, at Museum of Fine Arts, Boston, San Francisco Museum of Modern Art (SFMOMA), Mori Art Museum, and National Museum of Modern Art, Tokyo, among other international venues.

His works are held in the collections of San Francisco Museum of Modern Art (SFMOMA), Museum of Fine Arts, Boston, Peabody Essex Museum, Tokyo Metropolitan Museum of Photography, and Musée Guimet, among others.

== List of installations ==
"Photography Will Be" –– Aichi Prefectural Museum of Art "Silver-plated" –– Artpace San Antonio "In the Wake" The Museum of Fine Arts, Boston "To What End?" –– Camera Austria, Graz "The 41st Ikei Kimura Award Exhibition" –– Konica Minolta Gallery Dubai Photo, 2016 "In the Wake" –– Japan Society, NYC 2016 Festival Photo La Gacilly, 2016 "Tomorrow's History" –– Gallery Intersection 611, Hiroshima (Work in Progress) "A New and Mysterious Art" –– Howard Greenberg Gallery The 11th Shanghai Biennale, The Power Station Museum, Shanghai, 2017 "In the Wake" –– Asia Society Houston, 2017 "Takashi Arai: Bright was the Morning" Yokohama Civic Art Gallery Azumino

== Awards ==
In 2016, Arai received the 41st Kimura Ihei Award for his first monograph "MONUMENTS" (PGI, 2015). He is also the winner of the Source-Cord Prize (the Solas Prize) 2014, UK, and Photographic Society of Japan Awards: Newcomer's Award (2016). In 2018 he won the category prize at the 72nd Salerno International Film Festival for his short film “Oshira Kagami (The Mirror of the Oshira Deity).”

== Other work ==
Arai has also worked as a researcher for interdisciplinary studies since 2017. These projects include the “Interdisciplinary Studies of Radiation Effects on the Everyday Life of Victims” with the National Museum of Ethnology, and “Anima Philosophica: Nature, Disaster, and Animism in Japan” with the Institute for Research in Humanities, Kyoto University.
