= Mutsuo Sugiura =

Japanese engineer (1918–1986)

Mutsuo Sugimura (杉浦 睦夫, Sugiura Mutsuo; March 13, 1918 – August 26, 1986) was a Japanese engineer famous for being the first to develop a Gastro-camera (a present-day Esophagogastroduodenoscope). His story was illustrated in the NHK TV documentary feature, "Project X: Challengers: The Development of a Gastro-camera Wholly Made in Japan".

Sugiura graduated from Tokyo Polytechnic University in 1938 and then joined Olympus Corporation. While working at this company, he first developed an Esophagogastroduodenoscope in 1950. He died in 1986 at the age of 68.
