= Hiroko Komatsu =

- Born: 1969 (age 56–57)
- Partner: Osamu Kanemura
- Website: https://komatsu-hiroko.com/

Komatsu Hiroko (小松浩子) is a Japanese artist and photographer. She was born in Kanagawa Prefecture, Japan in 1969. She has held exhibitions both domestically in Japan and internationally in countries such as Germany, Italy, and the United States. She received the 43rd Kimura Ihei Award for new photographers in 2018. She has also received a grant from the Japan-U.S. Friendship Commission.

== Career ==
Komatsu started her creative career as an experimental noise artist and only picked up photography in the mid-2000s after participating in a darkroom workshop. Due to her late introduction into the medium, she felt that she needed to ‘catch up’ to other photographers and rented a space in Tokyo and began to produce one new exhibition every month from 2010 to 2011. This ambitious exhibition project was titled Broiler Space, and it was in this highly self-motivated rapid-fire production environment and its spatial limitations that Komatsu started to experiment with exhibit photographs in non-traditional experimental ways and developed into mixed media installations.

== Artistry ==
=== Installation style and development ===
Komatsu Hiroko has established herself through her singular experimental installations which utilize a magnitude of photographs more than traditional photography exhibitions. Where traditional photograph exhibitions present framed photographs spaced out in even intervals throughout the exhibition space, Komatsu plasters unframed black-and-white photographs across the walls, hangs them from the ceilings and spreads them over the floors so viewers must tread upon her photographs to access the exhibition space. In an example of the scale that she often works in, for a workshop with University of Hartford students, she developed 18 black-and-white photographs on a 100-foot roll of photographic paper.

In another example of her non-traditional installations for her exhibition at the gallery dieFirma in New York City in October 2021, visitors were enveloped by countless photographs exhibited on the walls like wallpaper and even on the floor, which the visitors had to tread upon to enter the exhibition space. Komatsu states that many of the photographs of industrial sites for this exhibition were taken during the COVID-19 pandemic which coincided with a construction boom in Japan leading up to the 2020 Tokyo Olympics. The pandemic caused many projects to halt their construction, which allowed Komatsu to take many of her photographs of empty construction sites which she calls, “shiny ruins.” In an interview with photography curator Pauline Vermare, Komatsu describes how it is difficult to discern if these sites are in the process of construction or demolishment. She states that she was attracted to these sites not only because they were sites of construction for the country's infrastructure, but also because the working class human labor involved in the construction of such sites were a part of human infrastructure on which society is built.

In 2021, MEM Gallery in Ebisu, Tokyo held an exhibition, Silent Sound, that exemplifies her non-traditional installations. Komatsu filmed three live music performances and projected these films simultaneously using three different super 8 projectors. The film passed through these projectors cut dynamically through the exhibition space going through a pulley system. Although the moving images were not accompanied by any sound, the exhibition space was filled with the sound of the film moving through the super 8 projector. In an adjacent room, Komatsu exhibited her "photographic sculptures" which were sheets of printed images and a DVD wrapped in plastic. For the exhibition art critic Umezu Gen contributed an essay explaining the connection between Komatsu's work and his own.

=== Art objects ===
Komatsu is known for her handmade objects which go far beyond the conventional format of the photobook. For example Black Book #1 (2021) is a bottle that is filled with little pieces of cut-out paper from texts such as Greta Thunberg’s book No One Is Too Small to Make a Difference and Theodore Kaczynski’s Industrial Society and Its Future: The Unabomber Manifesto. She chose this format because she felt the conventional forms of photobooks that catalogue a curated selection of photographs was not sufficient to capture her installation. This format of cutting texts from a book and putting them into a bottle was also inspired by her conception of photographs as text. For Komatsu, a single photograph is like a single word in that it does not provide enough context to be understood; it is only though stringing them together that meaning can be discerned. Building on this idea, she states, “Also, when you take a picture, you frame a part of reality, and then you move the image to another place, such as an exhibition venue or bookstore. I thought the process was very similar to cutting out texts from a book and putting them into an object, in this installation, a bottle.”

== Critical reception ==
In Komatsu's monograph, Creative Destruction, published for her exhibition at the David Museum's Morelle Lasky Levine ’56 Works on Paper Gallery at Wellesley College, photography curator Carrie Cushman argues that Komatsu is part of the tradition of Japanese street photography’s prolific production of photographs. But unlike her predecessors like Moriyama Daido that focus on the act of photography shooting everyday urban scenes, the sheer scale of Komatsu’s photography installations brings the materials of the photography to the attention of the viewer. Her usage of uncut rolls of photographs of urban scenes hanging from the ceiling or exhibited half unfurled and her use of projectors call into question the materiality of the medium of photography itself through a multisensory immersive experience. Cushman argues that this is part of the global modern art movement of Minimalism or Mono-ha in Japan where large works interrupt the gallery spaces and present questions to viewers about the relationships between objects in space.

Cushman uses Stephen Cairns and Jane M. Jacob’s book Buildings Must Die to analyze Komatsu’s choice of motif, construction sites and the inherent connection between creation and destruction in late stage capitalism. She quotes from their book where they refer to creative destruction as “architecture’s most perverse secret.” Cushman observes that Komatsu's work reflects this “model driven… by urban planning policies and cycles of investment and disinvestment that treat buildings as commodities to be continuously rebuilt.” She states that the generic nature of the numerous industrial sites that Komatsu's photographs and the volume with which Komatsu presents her images decontextualize them and desensitize the viewer creating an “relentless cyclicality of creative destruction (which) is easily overlooked in our everyday lives.”

Cushman then relates Komatsu's images of unrelenting industrial development to Walter Benjamin’s analysis of run down nineteenth-century shopping arcades of Paris. She quotes from Frederic Jameson’s book, The Arcades Project, which builds on Benjamin’s analysis. Jameson argues that these areas on the verge of ruin contributed to the disappearance of history which leads to an inability to determine the future. This will lead to a conception of “a History that we cannot imagine except as ending, and whose future seems to be nothing but a monotonous repetition of what is already here.”

According to Cushman, while Japanese urban photography in the postwar and contemporary Japan have earnestly captured the city in redevelopment and flux in a supposedly objective manner, the repetition that Komatsu uses in her photography and her installation techniques undermine this historical preservation. Cushman argues that the lack of chronology in Komatsu's work deconstructs the temporality of the industrial sites, compressing them into a “coexistence of multiple experience of time in a single space.”

In another essay published in the same book, Creative Destruction, Franz Prichard argues that sheer volume of photographs and other forms of media in Komatsu's installations renders the word “viewing” insufficient to capture the experience of the people who visit her exhibitions. He suggests that an “aesthetics of overload” is a more sufficient term, drawing parallels to Komatsu's formative experiences in experimental noise music and the positive feedback loops utilized in that medium. He argues that Komatsu “photographically, rather than sonically, renders a noisy, expressive form of feedback that saturates our sensorial capacities.” Her usage of photographs is not so much to present an image to the viewer but to expose them to a proliferation of photographs. This technique ultimately creates a very different sense of meaning from traditional photography exhibitions which seek to convey meaning in isolation or in sequence. Prichard argues that Komatsu's meaning making comes from the “amplification of photochemical processes and materials,” which is also a metaphor that resonates with experimental noise music.

Prichard argues that the way that Komatsu photographs industrial materials reveals a "material unconsciousness of the myriad invisible, indeterminate processes at play in the ceaseless reproduction of an urban expanse under capitalist relations of production." By photographing these industrial materials and presenting them in her installation at a scale which resembles the scale at which these materials are used, she is exposing the “immense, unfamiliar infrastructures and logistics of a capitalist urban order that intimately informs our everyday but that remain always just beyond the thresholds of our awareness.” Even though we may be exposed to constant urban demolition and construction, these sites are often covered or hidden from view, materials are brought in overnight to avoid traffic, so we can never see the full scale of the materials destroyed and used in the relentless construction and destruction of cities. Komatsu's installations purposefully overwhelm the viewer to convey this sense of scale that usually unseen.

=== I'm So Happy You Are Here: Japanese Women Photogarphers from the 1950s to Now ===
In 2024, Komatsu’s work was included in the group exhibition I’m So Happy You Are Here: Japanese Women Photographers from the 1950s to Now. The exhibition opened at the Rencontres d’Arles in France, and then traveled to Fotomuseum Den Haag in the Netherlands, Fotografie Forum Frankfurt in Germany in 2025, and The Photographers’ Gallery in London in 2026. An expanded Japanese edition was presented at Hikarie Hall in Tokyo in 2026.

In their essay “The Women Who Built Worlds with Their Cameras,” Carrie Cushman and Kelly Midori McCormick situate Komatsu’s career within changing conditions for women in photography. They interpret her recognition without formal photographic training as a testament to both her work ethic and structural changes that have made the contemporary art world more accessible to women. They argue that her practice questions patriarchal and capitalist structures governing artistic production and criticism, describing it as “a form of world-building that takes the materials of photography as its foundation.”

== Collections ==
Her works are included as permanent collections at The Mast Foundation in Bologna, Tate Modern in London, the Kawasaki City Museum, the Art Institute of Chicago, and the New York Public Library.
