= Mika Ninagawa =

Japanese photographer and director (born 1972)

- 蜷川 実花
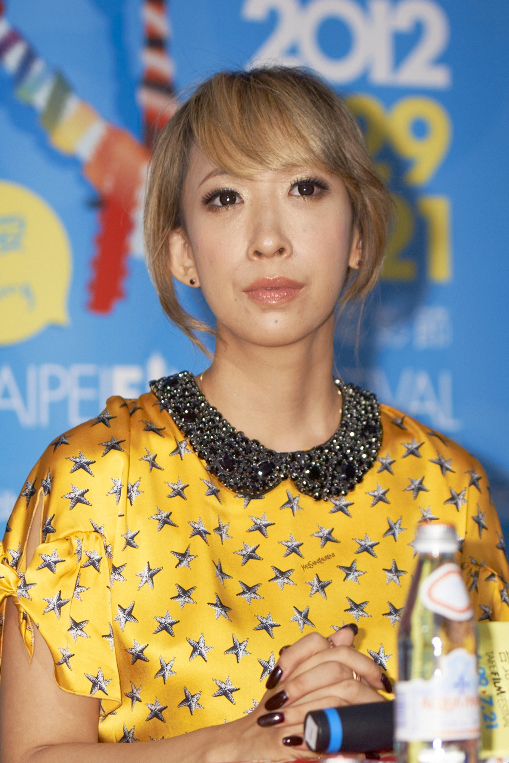
- Mika Ninagawa in July 2012
- Born: October 18, 1972 (age 54); Tokyo, Japan
- Occupations: Photographer, film director
- Website: ninamika.com

Mika Ninagawa (蜷川 実花, Ninagawa Mika; born October 18, 1972) is a Japanese photographer and director, known for her brightly colored photographs of flowers, goldfish, and landscapes.

== Biography ==
Daughter of acclaimed theatre director Yukio Ninagawa, she first came to prominence in the late 1990s as part of Japan's 'Girly Photo' movement (in which amateurs took photos of daily objects). Her work was first exhibited outside Japan in 1997 at the Parisian concept store Colette (boutique), and in 2001 she received the 26th Kimura Ihei Award (Japan's most prestigious photography award).

In 2014, she was appointed as an executive board member of the Tokyo Organizing Committee for the Olympic and Paralympic Games of 2020.

== Work ==
Ninagawa has enjoyed significant commercial success in fashion and advertising. She made her debut as a full-length film director in 2007 with Sakuran. In September 2010, her music video for the AKB48 song "Heavy Rotation" was released. She directed the live action film adaptation of the manga Helter Skelter in 2012. In 2019, Ninagawa directed the film Ningen Shikkaku: Osamu Dazai and the three women, a biographical film about Osamu Dazai, starring Shun Oguri. The film remained in the top 5 at the box office in its first 2 weeks. In 2020, her web series directorial debut was with Netflix's Followers.

Alongside photographers like Hiromix and Yurie Nagashima they were important figures in a 1990s photographic movement. This movement, influenced by cultural changes, point & shoot cameras, and 'Purikura' (Print Club) culture, featured Japanese teenagers, especially girls, creating a new visual style.

== Awards ==
- 1996: Grand Prize, 9th Shashin Hitotsubo Ten
- 1996: New Cosmos of Photography Excellence Award, Canon
- 1998: Photo Encouragement Award, Konica
- 2001: The 26th Kimura Ihei Award, Asahi Shimbun Publishing Co.
- 2006: Ohara Museum of Art Prize
- 2012: Kaneto Shindo Award 2012

== Photography ==
- Shikao Suga's "Aitai" album cover and artist photo (2013)

=== Exhibitions ===
- Into Fiction/Reality, Iwaki City Art Museum, Fukushima, Japan, Apr 13 - May 26, 2019
- Taichung World Flora Exposition, Taichung, Taiwan, Nov 03, 2018 - Apr 24, 2019
- Hotel Anteroom Kyoto, Kyoto, Japan, Jul 14, 2016 - Present
- Mika Ninagawa: Self-image, Hara Museum of Contemporary Art, Jan 24 – May 10, 2015
- Mika's daydreaming theater
1. Parco Factory, Shibuya Tokyo, Japan, March 20, 2008 - April 7, 2008
2. Sapporo Parco, Sapporo, Japan, April 25, 2008 - May 11, 2008
3. Nagoya Parco, Nagoya, Japan, May 17, 2008 - June 2, 2008
4. Sendai Parco, Sendai, Japan, August 21, 2008 - September 15, 2008

== Filmography ==
=== Movies ===
- Sakuran (2007)
- Helter Skelter (2012)
- Diner (2019)
- No Longer Human (2019)
- xxxHolic (2022)

=== TV and Web TV Series ===
- Followers (2020, Netflix)

=== Music videos ===
Year	Music video	Artist	Notes
2007	"Ashita Tenki ni Naare" (明日天気になぁれ)	Yuzu	
2010	"Heavy Rotation"	AKB48	Also produced CD jacket.
2011	"Yobisute Fantasy" (呼び捨てファンタジー)	AKB48 Team B	Found on the "Ue kara Mariko" single.
2012	"Hanabi" (花火)	Sandaime J Soul Brothers	Also produced CD jacket.
2012	"Sugar Rush"	AKB48	Soundtrack for the Disney film Wreck-It Ralph.
2012	"Powder Snow (Eien ni Owaranai Fuyu)" (Powder Snow ～永遠に終わらない冬～)	Sandaime J Soul Brothers	Also produced CD jacket.
2013	"Girl on Fire"	Alicia Keys	Special video produced for Japan.
2013	"Pink Spider"	Kumi Koda	Also produced associated UULA short drama.
2013	"Sayonara Crawl"	AKB48	
2013	"Issen Ichibyō" (一千一秒)	Exile Takahiro	
2013	"Ame nochi Harelujah" (雨のち晴レルヤ)	Yuzu	
2015	"Kaguya"	News	
2016	"Kimi wa Melody"	AKB48	
2017	"Flame of Love"	Taemin	

== Books ==
- ピンク・ローズ・スウィート : 蜷川実花写真集. Pink Rose Suite. Tokyo, Japan: Editions Treville, 2001. ISBN 9784309904177.
- A Piece of Heaven. Tokyo, Japan: Editions Treville, 2002. ISBN 4-309-90493-9. Color photographs.
- Liquid Dreams. Tokyo, Japan: Editions Treville, 2003. ISBN 4-309-90556-0. Color photographs.
- On Happiness - Contemporary Japanese Photography. with Midori Mitamura and Toshihiro Komatsu, eds. Tokyo, Japan: Editions Treville, 2003. ISBN 9784309905518. Color Photographs.
- Acid Bloom. Portland, Ore.: Nazraeli Press, 2004. ISBN 1-59005-066-5. Color photographs.
- Floating Yesterday. Tokyo, Japan: Kodansha, 2005. ISBN 4-06-213075-0. Color photographs.
- Mika's daydreaming theater Tokyo, Japan: Shueisha, 2008 ISBN 4087712222 ISBN 978-4087712223. Color Photographs.
- Fever - Mizu Natsuki. Bangkok, Thailand: Hankyu Communications, 2008. ISBN 978-4484085081. Color Photographs
- Ninagawa Baroque. Tokyo, Japan: Artbeat Publishers, 2010. ISBN 9784902080308.
- Mika Ninagawa. New York : Rizzoli, 2010. ISBN 9780847833979. Color Photographs

== Other projects ==
Ninagawa was involved in the interior design of the Bar & Cafè on the Bund cafe and bar in Shanghai, China.

Ninagawa was involved in designing the external livery of a new Genbi Shinkansen excursion train scheduled to be operated in Japan by JR East from spring 2016.

She appears alongside fellow movie director Yūichi Fukuda, in a scene as a couple, in TV Tokyo's 2019 special 2-day drama starring Shun Oguri and Tsuyoshi Muro, Futatsu no Sokoku (Two homelands).
