= Hiroshi Suga =

Japanese photographer

Hiroshi Suga (管 洋志, Suga Hiroshi) (1945–2013) was a Japanese photographer who is particularly known for his photography of Bali.

Suga was born in Hakata, Fukuoka Prefecture, in 1945. He graduated in photography from Nihon University.

He won the Domon Ken Award in 1987 for photographs of Bali and the Higashikawa Domestic Photographers Award in 1998 for photographs of Burma. He has been a professor at Nihon University.

== Publications ==
=== Books by Suga ===
- Makai, tenkai, fujigikai, Bari (魔界・天界・不思議界・バリ). Tokyo: Kodansha, 1983. ISBN 4-06-200538-7. Photographs of Bali.
- Bari miwaku: Suga Hiroshi sakuhinshū (バリ魅惑 管洋志作品集). Tokyo: Genkō-sha. ISBN 4-7683-0026-X. Text by Morio Kitahara (北原守夫). Photographs of Bali.
- Ajia mugen-kō: Suga Hiroshi sakuhinshū (アジア夢幻行 管洋志作品集) / Strides Across Images of Asia. Photo Salon. Tokyo: Genkō-sha, 1987. ISBN 4-7683-0004-9.
- Dai-Nikkō: Suga Hiroshi shashinshū (大日光 管洋志写真). Tokyo: Kodansha, 1991. ISBN 4-06-204888-4. Photographs of Nikkō.
- Hakata Gion Yamagasa (博多祇園山笠). Fukuoka: Kaichōsha, 1995. ISBN 4-87415-114-0.
- Etsunan saisai (越南彩彩). Ajia Minzoku Shashin Sōsho 17. Tokyo: Hirakawa Shuppansha, 1996. ISBN 4-89203-278-6. Photographs of Vietnam.
- Myanmā ōgon: Suga Hiroshi shashin (ミャンマー黄金 管洋志写真). Tokyo: Tōhō-shuppan, 1997. ISBN 4-88591-546-5. Photographs of Burma.
- Unnan no suito Reikō: Suga Hiroshi shashinshū (雲南の水都・麗江 管洋志・写真集). Tokyo: Tōhō-shuppan, 2000. ISBN 4-88591-656-9. Photographs of Lijiang, Yunnan.
- Bari-tō dai-hyakka (バリ島大百科). Tokyo: TBS Britannica, 2001. ISBN 4-484-01404-1. Photographs of Bali.
- Mekon 4525km (メコン4525km). Tokyo: Jitsugyō-no-Nihon-sha, 2002. ISBN 4-408-01714-0. Photographs along the Mekong.
- Kyō no katadomari (京の片泊まり). Tokyo: Futabasha, 2004. ISBN 4575476277. Photographs of Kyoto.
- Suga Hiroshi ... Amami: Shima ni ikite (管洋志…奄美 シマに生きて). Tokyo: Shinchosha, 2007. ISBN 978-4-10-305901-1. Photographs of Amami Ōshima.

=== Other books with contributions by Suga ===
- Hakata Gion Yamagasa (博多祇園山笠). Tokyo: Kodansha, 1983. ISBN 4-06-200166-7. Text by Hōsei Hasegawa (長谷川法世). Photographs of Fukuoka.
- Matsuri to geinō no shima Bali (祭りと芸能の島バリ). Music Gallery 3. Tokyo: Ongaku-no-tomo-sha, 1984. ISBN 4-276-38003-0. Text by Fumiko Tamura (田村史子) and Teigo Yoshida (吉田禎吾). Photographs of Bali.
- Bari: Chō-mugen-kai (バリ・超夢幻界). Tokyo: Ōbunsha, 1987. ISBN 4-01-070752-6. Translation of Bali Entranced, with essays by Lyall Watson. Photographs of Bali.
- Ajia gensō: Mōmu o tabi suru (アジア幻想 モ-ムを旅する). Tokyo: Kodansha, 1989. ISBN 4-06-204366-1. Text by Tomomi Muramatsu (村松友視). Travels across Asia following William Somerset Maugham.
- Shanhai suigan (上海酔眼). Tokyo: Kodansha. ISBN 4-06-183608-0. Text by Tomomi Muramatsu. Photographs of Shanghai.
- Chiisa na tomodachi: Shakashū (小さな友だち 写歌集). Tokyo: Kodansha, 1996. ISBN 4-06-266351-1. With tanka by Machi Tawara.
- Madamu ajian no yasashii gohan (マダムアジアンのやさしいごはん). Tokyo: Kōsaidō Shuppan, 2001. ISBN 4-331-50767-X. Text by Keiko Moriwaki (森脇慶子).
- Kusa o hamu: Kyōto "Nakahigashi" no shiki (草をハむ 京都「なかひがし」の四季). Tokyo: President-sha, 2002. ISBN 4-8334-1755-3. Text by Hisashi Kashiwai (柏井寿). On Japanese food in Kyoto.
- Uchidate Machiko no gyōten Chūgoku (內館牧子の仰天中国). Tokyo: JTB, 2003. ISBN 4-533-04856-0. Text by Machiko Uchidate (內館牧子).
- Kore tabe! (これ食べ!). Tokyo: Shinchosha, 2003. ISBN 4-10-446203-9. About restaurants in Tokyo. Text by Masahiko Katsuya.
- Masahiro no Tōkyō zubari hyakken (マスヒロの東京ずばり百軒). Tokyo: Jitsugyō-no-Nihon-sha, 2007. ISBN 978-4-408-00818-9. About restaurants in Tokyo. Text by Masahiro Yamamoto (山本益博).
- Kizzu fotogurafāzu no mōgakkō no 23-nin ga totta! (キッズフォトグラファーズ盲学校の23人が撮った!). Tokyo: Shinchosha, 2008. ISBN 978-4-10-305902-8. Photographs by blind schoolchildren, edited by Suga.
- Sushi: Sukiyabashi Jirō: Bi, shoku, waza (鮨 すきやばし次郎 美・職・技). Tokyo: Graphic-sha, 2009. ISBN 978-4-7661-2064-6. Also titled Sushi (寿司). Text by the sushi chef Jiro Ono (小野二郎), edited by Masahiro Yamamoto.
- Dāisuki na mono pachiri! Fotoarubamu-ehon (だ〜いすきなものパチリ! フォトアルバム絵本). Tokyo: Nihon Hyōjun, 2009. ISBN 978-4-8208-0418-5. Photographs by blind schoolchildren, edited by Suga.
- Kikoerukai mori no koe: Afan no mori suga hiroshi shashinshū (聞えるかい森の声 アファンの森管洋志写真集). Tokyo: Studio Debo, 2009. ISBN 4-270-00471-1. Text by C. W. Nicol.
