= Mouna Karray =

- Born: 1970 (age 54–55); Sfax, Tunisia
- Education: Master of Image Media, Tokyo Polytechnic University, Japan
- Known for: Photography
- Notable work: Nobody Will Talk About Us
- Website: www.mounakarray.com

Mouna Karray (born 1970) is a Tunisian photographer and video artist. Born in Sfax, Tunisia, she is primarily known for her photography and film. Her art explores socio-political themes in relation to identity.

== Background and education ==
Karray was born in 1970 in Sfax, Tunisia. She studied cinema and photography at the Institut Supérieur d’Animation Culturelle in Tunis and earned her Masters in Photography in 2001 at the Tokyo Polytechnic University in Japan. She has done residencies at Centre d’Art Vivant De Radès (2004, Tunisia), the Cité internationale des arts (2005, Paris), and the Civitella Ranieri Foundation (2007, Umbria, Italy). She is currently working in Sfax and Paris.

== Art ==
Karray's work mostly consists of photography and film, with themes of poverty, gender, and the Arab Spring resonating strongly. Her work mostly focuses on political messaging, as well as her experiences as a woman, an Arab, and a Tunisian. Her work focuses on how poverty has spread throughout Tunisia, as well as the Tunisian Revolution. She uses her photography to specifically address poverty by documenting landscapes that have been neglected or abandoned, often juxtaposed with the people that still live there. She frequently photographs everyday objects and people, offering the audience of her work a glimpse into the subject's daily life.

== Works ==
=== Self Circumstances (2000) ===
Karray developed the Self Circumstances series of self portraits while she was in Tokyo in 2000, which is based on Karray's experience of moving to Tokyo from Africa. The self-portraits were shot with hung metal rings in a public park. Karray used these in her self-portraits to evoke the impression of being lost in a labyrinth, which she perceived Tokyo to be at the time.

=== Au Risque de l’identite/ Identity at Stake (2006) ===
In Au Risque de l’identite/ Identity at Stake, Karray would recruit women volunteers, without priorly meeting them, to come and take photographs. Then, after taking a shot of these women, she would dress up as them and replicate the image she had just taken, as a photography series as well as a performance art piece. The models in these photos were never prompted to pose, resulting in completely natural views. The model's natural posture and attitude would then have to be matched by Karray.

=== Murmurer (2007–2009) ===
From 2007 to 2009, Karray photographed the port areas of Sfax, Tunisia, the city she was born in. Murmurer depicts a gap between the decrepit ports and the rest of Sfax; in a city that is densely populated, there are few people in the images, emphasizing the contrast between the broken, abandoned structures and a lively cityscape.

=== Live (2012) ===
In 2012, Karray made a six-minute video titled Live, this video is still propaganda images from the deposed president Ben Ali. This project's unedited film consisted of a discussion between a taxi driver and a passenger. They openly discuss the prior regime and the current government they are under. This piece uses the contrast of the conversation you are hearing, and the visuals of the propaganda to give the viewer an inside look into the political happenings of Tunis in 2011 and 2012.

=== Nobody will talk about us (2012) ===
In Nobody will talk about us Karray photographs of the Southern religion of Tunisia. This region has been forgotten and cut off from the rest of the country. She is attempting to raise awareness of this forgotten region through her series of works. This work captures not only desolate landscapes, but also the people who live in them, bringing awareness to the fact that they still exist. She has stated, "I went back to the Tunisian southwest, its silent poverty, its mineral loneliness, its arid and forgotten soils whose foundations were rich with minerals, which have been confiscated and stripped from these oppressed – but not submissive – souls,"

== Exhibitions ==
Individual exhibitions

- Nobody will talk about us, Tyburn Gallery, London (2016)
- Murmurer, Galerie El Marsa, Tunis (2011)
- The cut-out, Diwan Dar el Jeld de la Medina, Tunis (2004)

Collective exhibitions (selection)

- Dak'Art, Dakar (2016)
- The Sea is my Land, MAXXI, Rome (2013)
- Ici, ailleurs, Friche la Belle de Mai, Tour-Panorama, Marseille (2013)
- The Bamako Encounters, Calouste Gulbenkian Foundation, Lisbon (2013)
- Bright Future Contemporary Art from Tunisia, Ifa Gallery Stuttgart (2013)
- #COMETOGETHER: LONDON, Edge of Arabia. Old Truman Brewery, London (2012)
- Bright Futur Contemporary Art from Tunisia, Ifa Gallery Berlin (2012)
- Dream City, 3rd edition, Sfax, Tunis (2012)
- The Bamako Encounters, BOZAR, Brussels (2012)
- Chkoun Ahna, Musée National de Carthage, Tunisia (2012)
- Dégagement… La Tunisie un an après, Institut du Monde Arabe, Paris (2012)
- Les 9e Rencontres de la photographie, Bamako (2011)
- A Useful Dream, BOZAR, Brussels (2010)
- PICHA, Image encounters, Lubumbashi (2010)
- L'autre bord #1, Galerie des grands bains douches, Marseille (2010)
- Photoquai, Musée du Quai Branly, Paris (2009)
- Spot on Bamako 2007, IFA gallery, Stuttgart (2009)
- Women of images, snatches of intimacy, Centre Culturelle Française a Beyrouth, Lebanon (2009)
