= Yoshino Ōishi =

Japanese photojournalist

Yoshino Ōishi (大石 芳野, Ōishi Yoshino; born May 28, 1944) is a Japanese photojournalist.

Ōishi was born in Suginami-ku, Tokyo on 28 May 1944. Seeing Melanesian art while at Nihon University had a big effect on her, as did a visit to Vietnam and Cambodia in 1966. After graduating in photography, she became a freelance photojournalist, working in west Africa, southeast Asia, and Europe. In 1971 she held an exhibition in the Nikon Salon of photographs of a Ghanaian child growing up in Nagano; she then spent three years photographing New Guinea. She worked on portraiture, and documented the effects of the Khmer Rouge in Cambodia, the effects of wartime dioxin in Vietnam, perestroika in the Soviet Union, and more.

Ōishi's work on Vietnam won her the Domon Ken Award. In both 1982 and 1989 she won the Annual Award from the Photographic Society of Japan. She has taught at Tokyo Polytechnic University. Her work is in the permanent collection of the Tokyo Metropolitan Museum of Photography.

== Books by Ōishi ==
- Itoshi no Nyūginia (愛しのニューギニア). Tokyo: Gakushū-kenkyūsha, 1978. (in Japanese) On New Guinea.
- Hana modashi: Ōishi Yoshino shashinshū (花黙し 大石芳野写真集). Tokyo: Buronzu-sha, 1979. (in Japanese)
- Onna no kuni ni natta Kanbojia (女の国になったカンボジア). Tokyo: Ushio Shuppansha, 1980. (in Japanese) On Cambodia.
- Mukoku no tami: Kanbojia no shōgen (無告の民 カンボジアの証言). Tokyo: Iwanami Shoten, 1981. (in Japanese) On Cambodia.
- Papua-jin: Ima seki-jidai ni ikiru (パプア人 いま石器時代に生きる). Tokyo: Heibonsha, 1981. (in Japanese) On Papua.
- Wani no tami: Meraneshia geijutsu no hitobito (ワニの民 メラネシア芸術の人びと). Tokyo: Tōjusha, 1983. (in Japanese) On Melanesia.
- Shōnen Papanī (少年パパニー). Tokyo: Yayoi Shobō, 1983. (in Japanese) On a Ghanaian child in Nagano.
- Oki no kuni (隠岐の国). Tokyo: Kumon Shuppan, 1984. ISBN 4-87576-177-5. (in Japanese) On the Oki islands.
- Shōgen suru tami: Jūnen ato no Betonamu sensō (証言する民 十年後のベトナム戦争). Tokyo: Kodansha, 1984. ISBN 4-06-201079-8. (in Japanese) On Vietnam.
- Okinawa ni ikiru (沖縄に活きる). Tokyo: Yōbisha, 1986. (in Japanese) On Okinawa.
- Okinawa no genzō: Uchi to soto no sōkoku (沖縄の原像 内と外との相克). Naha: Nirai-sha, 1988. ISBN 4-88024-112-1. With Masanori Nakahodo (仲程昌徳). (in Japanese) On Okinawa.
- "Yoru to kiri" o koete: Pōrando kyōsei shūyōjo no seikansha-tachi (〈夜と霧〉をこえて ポーランド・強制収容所の生還者たち). Tokyo: NHK, 1988. ISBN 4-14-008612-2. (in Japanese) On the survivors of German Nazi concentration camps in occupied Poland during World War II.
- Yoru to kiri wa ima (夜と霧は今) / Those Who Survived the Concentration Camps. Tokyo: Yōbisha, 1988. ISBN 4-946419-55-1. (in Japanese)
- Sobieto henreki: Ōishi Yoshino shashinshū (ソビエト遍歴 大石芳野写真集). Tokyo: NHK, 1991. ISBN 4-14-009166-5. (in Japanese) On the Soviet Union.
- Kanashimi no Sobieto: Minzoku o aruku (悲しみのソビエト 民族をあるく). Tokyo: Kodansha, 1991. ISBN 4-06-205400-0. (in Japanese) On the Soviet Union.
- Ano hi, Betonamu ni kare-hazai ga futta: Sensō no kizu-ato o mitsumetsuzuketa shinjitsu no kioku (あの日、ベトナムに枯葉剤がふった 戦争の傷あとを見つめつづけた真実の記録). Tokyo: Kumon Shuppan, 1992. ISBN 4-87576-741-2. (in Japanese) On Vietnam.
- Okinawa: Datsuwa no jidai (沖縄・脱和の時代). Naha: Nirai-sha, 1992. ISBN 4-88024-157-1. (in Japanese) On Okinawa. Text by Takeshi Miki (三木健).
- Kanbojia kugai tenshō: Ōishi Yoshino foto-dokyumento (カンボジア苦界転生 大石芳野フォト・ドキュメント). Tokyo: Kodansha, 1993. ISBN 4-06-314603-0. (in Japanese)
- Kamera o kata ni mita sekai (カメラを肩に見た世界). Messēji 21. Tokyo: Rōdō-junpō-sha, 1993. ISBN 4-8451-0323-0. (in Japanese)
- Hiroshima hanseki no shōzō: Yasuragi o motomeru hibi (半世紀の肖像 やすらぎを求める日々). Tokyo: Kadokawa Shoten, 1995. ISBN 4-04-851108-4. (in Japanese) On Hiroshima.
- Chiisa na kusa ni (小さな草に). Tokyo: Asahi Shinbunsha, 1997. ISBN 4-02-257060-1. (in Japanese)
- Kakki afurete nagai sensō no ato: Betonamu (活気あふれて長い戦争のあと ベトナム). Ajia no kodomo-tachi. Tokyo: Sōdo Bunka, 1997. ISBN 4-7945-0711-9. (in Japanese) On Vietnamese children.
- Okinawa wakanatsu no kioku (沖縄若夏の記憶). Tokyo: Iwanami Shoten, 1997. ISBN 4-00-022358-5. (in Japanese) On Okinawa.
- Inochi no ki: Ajia no hitobito to shizen (生命の木 アジアの人びとと自然). Tokyo: Sōdo Bunka, 1998. ISBN 4-7945-0764-X. (in Japanese)
- Betonamu rin to: Ōishi Yoshino shashinshū (ベトナム凛と 大石芳野写真集) / Vietnam after the War. Tokyo: Kodansha, 2000. ISBN 4-06-210395-8. (in Japanese)
- Kosobo hakai no hate ni: Ōishi Yoshino shashinshū (コソボ破壊の果てに 大石芳野写真集) / Ethnic Cleansing in Kosovo. Tokyo: Kodansha, 2002. ISBN 4-06-211309-0. (in Japanese)
- Afuganisutan senka o ikinuku: Ōishi Yoshino shashinshū (アフガニスタン戦禍を生きぬく 大石芳野写真集) / Afghanistan: Life under Fire and the Sword. Tokyo: Fujiwara Shoten, 2003. ISBN 4-89434-357-6. (in Japanese)
- Kosobo zetsubō no fuchi kara asu e (コソボ絶望の淵から明日へ). Tokyo: Iwanami Shoten, 2004. ISBN 4-00-026964-X. (in Japanese) On Kosovo.
- Kodomo ikusayo no naka de: Ōishi Yoshino shashinshū (子ども戦世のなかで 大石芳野写真集). Tokyo: Fujiwara Shoten, 2005. ISBN 4-89434-473-4. (in Japanese) On children.
- Tamashii to no deai: Shashinka to shakaigakusha no taiwa (魂との出会い 写真家と社会学者の対話). Tokyo: Fujiwara Shoten, 2007. ISBN 978-4-89434-601-7. (in Japanese) Conversations with the sociologist Kazuko Tsurumi (鶴見和子).
- Kurokawa-nō no sato: Shōnai ni idakarete (黒川能の里 庄内にいだかれて). Tokyo: Seiryū Shuppan, 2008. ISBN 978-4-86029-214-0. (in Japanese) With text by Akiko Baba (馬場あき子). On the Kurokawa nō theatre of Tsuruoka (Yamagata).
- "Fu-hatsudan" to ikiru: Inori o oru Raosu (<不発弾>と生きる 祈りを織るラオス). Tokyo: Fujiwara Shoten, 2008. ISBN 978-4-89434-661-1. (in Japanese) On Laos.
- Shimura no iro: Shimura Fukumi, Shimura Yōko no senshoku (しむらのいろ 志村ふくみ・志村洋子の染織) / Colors of the Shimuras. Tokyo: Kyūryūdō, 2009. ISBN 978-4-7630-0935-7. (in Japanese and English) On the kimono of Fukumi Shimura and Yōko Shimura, and with text by them.
- Sore demo emi o (それでも笑みを). Tokyo: Seiryū, 2011. ISBN 9784860293345.
- Fukushima Fukushima: Tsuchi to ikiru: Ōishi Yoshino shashinshū (福島Fukushima 土と生きる 大石芳野写真集). Tokyo: Fujiwara Shoten, 2013. ISBN 978-4-89434-893-6. (in Japanese) On Fukushima Prefecture after the tsunami.
