= Shinzō Shimao =

Japanese photographer (born 1948)

Shinzō Shimao (島尾伸三, Shimao Shinzō; born July 7, 1948 in Kobe) is a Japanese photographer.

He is a student of photographer Ōtsuji Kiyoji, and husband to Tokuko Ushioda.
