= Hiromix =

Japanese photographer and artist

- Born: Hiromi Toshikawa; 1976 (age 49–50); Suginami, Tokyo, Japan
- Known for: photographer and artist
- Notable work: Girls Blue, Japanese Beauty, Hiromix

Hiromi Toshikawa (利川 裕美, Toshikawa Hiromi; born 1976), better known as Hiromix (ヒロミックス, Hiromikkusu), is a Japanese photographer and artist.

== Biography ==
Hiromix won the 11th New Cosmos of Photography (写真新世紀, Shashin Shin-seiki) award in March 1995. She was nominated by Nobuyoshi Araki for a series of photographs called Seventeen Girl Days. Her photographs depicted life from a teenager's perspective. She was also a judge for the Cosmos of Photography contest from 2011 to 2015.

In 1996, Hiromix published her first book Girls Blue. She became known in the West with her book Hiromix, edited by the French photography critic Patrick Remy and published by Steidl in 1998. In 2000, she was awarded the Kimura Ihei Award for her book Hiromix Works. She has published several other photography books that are concerned with identity, community, gender and the everyday.

Alongside photographers like Yurie Nagashima and Mika Ninagawa, they were important figures in a 90s photographic movement. This movement, influenced by cultural changes, point & shoot cameras, and 'Purikura' (Print Club) culture, featured Japanese teenagers, especially girls, creating a new visual style.

As a former member of the Japanese band The Clovers, Hiromix also released a music album and continues to work as a DJ. She briefly appeared in a TV commercial for an Yves Saint Laurent fragrance called Jazz. The German photographer Wolfgang Tillmans photographed her in 1997. She also has a cameo appearance in the 2003 film Lost in Translation, directed by Sofia Coppola. She photographed for fashion brand Kenzo's pre-fall collection in 2016.

== Exhibitions ==
=== Solo exhibitions ===
- Start of Spring, Radiance of the Heart, Hiromi Yoshii Gallery, Tokyo (2009)
- St. Valentin Special | Room of Love, Eye of Gyre, Tokyo (2010)
- The Wonder of Love and Time, Hidari Zingaro, Tokyo (2015)

=== Group exhibitions ===
- Superflat Exhibition, Tokyo (1999)
- Gazes that Define the Era: 30 Years of the Kimura Ihei Award 1975–2005, Kawasaki City Museum, Tokyo (2005)
- Shoot (Rizzoli, U.S.), Parco Gallery, Tokyo (2009)
- A Room in Which To Contemplate Love, No Man's Land, Tokyo (2009)
- 40 Years of the Kimura Ihei Award, 1975–2015, Kawasaki Museum, Tokyo (2015)
- Takashi Murakami Collection, Tokyo and other cities (2016)
- Japanese Women Photographers: From 1950s to Now, The Photographers’ Gallery, London (2026)

== Books ==
- Girl's Blue (1996)
- Japanese Beauty (1997)
- Hikari (1997)
- Hiromix Paris (1998)
- Hiromix (1998)
