= Nihon University =

Private, higher education institution in Japan

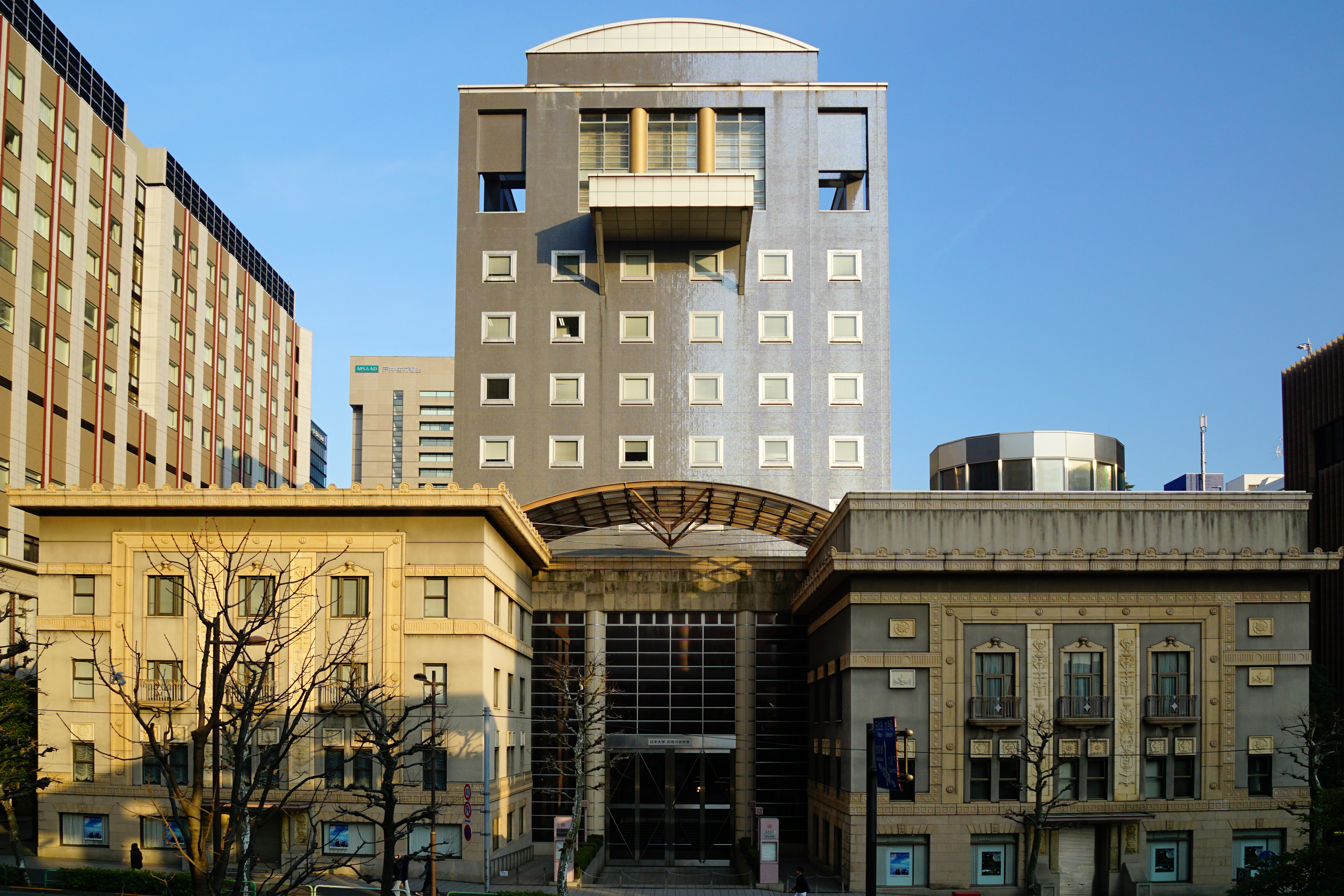
- Nihon University Casals Hall
- Type: Private
- Established: 1889
- Founder: Yamada Akiyoshi
- President: Takeo Sakai (until 31 March 2024)
- Academic staff: 4,168
- Administrative staff: 1,720
- Students: 70,821
- Undergraduates: 68,817
- Location: Chiyoda, Tokyo, Japan; 35°41′28″N 139°44′15″E
- Campus: 622 acres (252 ha)
- Colors: Pink
- Mascot: Phoenix
- Website: www.nihon-u.ac.jp

Academic rankings

National
- U.S. News & World Report: 39

Global
- U.S. News & World Report: 1381

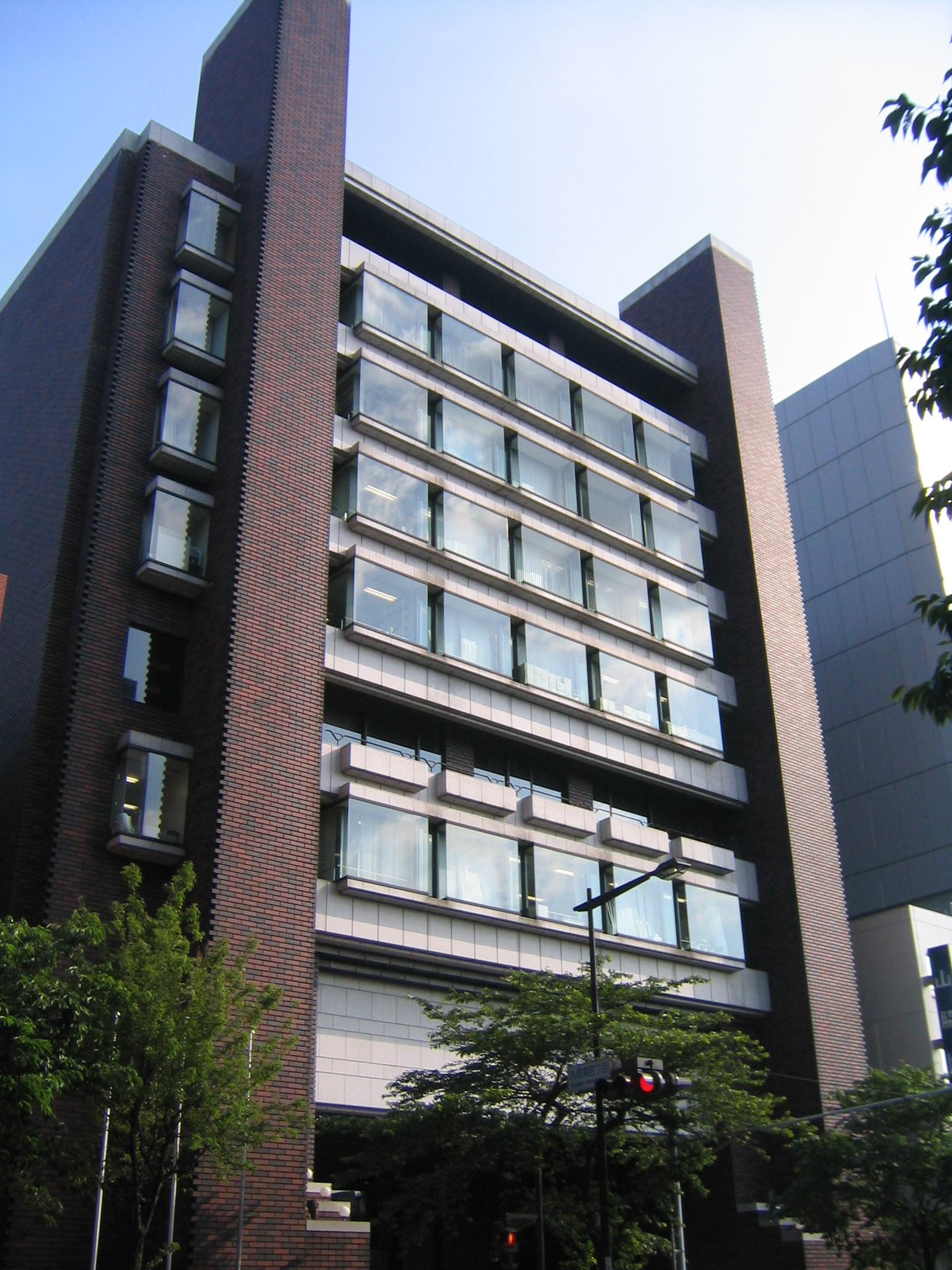
Nihon University head office

Nihon University (日本大学, Nihon Daigaku; lit. 'Japan University'), abbreviated as Nichidai (日大), is a private research university in Japan. Its predecessor, Nihon Law School (currently the Department of Law), was founded by Yamada Akiyoshi, the Minister of Justice, in 1889. The university's name is derived from the Japanese word "Nihon" meaning Japan. Nihon University now has 16 colleges and 87 departments, 20 postgraduate schools, one junior college which is composed of five departments, one correspondence division, 32 research institutes and three hospitals. The number of students exceeds 70,000 and is the largest in Japan.

== University profile ==
Most of the university's campuses are in the Kantō region, with the vast majority in Tokyo or surrounding areas, although two campuses are as far away from Tokyo as Shizuoka Prefecture and Fukushima Prefecture. These campuses mostly accommodate single colleges or schools (gakubu (学部) in Japanese). In December 2016 the university acquired the former Newcastle Court House in Newcastle, New South Wales, Australia for A$6.6 million as its inaugural international campus.

The university comprises a federation of colleges and institutes known for having produced numerous Japanese CEOs. Its College of Art (日芸 — Nichigei), located right next to Ekoda train station in Tokyo's Nerima ward, is well known for producing many artists who represent Japan in photography, theater, and cinema. In addition, the university has over 20 affiliated high schools bearing its name across Japan, from which a significant number of students go on to study at the institution as undergraduates.

== Faculties and graduate schools ==
=== Colleges and departments ===
- College of Law (1889-; Chiyoda, Tokyo & Saitama, Saitama)
  - Law / Political Science and Economics / Journalism / Management Law / Public Administration
- College of Humanities and Sciences (1901-; Setagaya, Tokyo)
  - Philosophy / History / Japanese Language and Literature / Chinese Language and Culture / English Literature / German Literature
  - Sociology / Education / Physical Education / Psychology
  - Geography / Geosystem Sciences / Mathematics / Computer Science and System Analysis / Physics / Integrated Science in Physics and Biology / Chemistry
- College of Economics (1904-; Chiyoda, Tokyo)
  - Economics (1st division / 2nd division / international course) / Industrial Management / Finance and Public Economics
- College of Commerce (1904-; Setagaya, Tokyo)
  - Commerce / Business Administration / Accounting

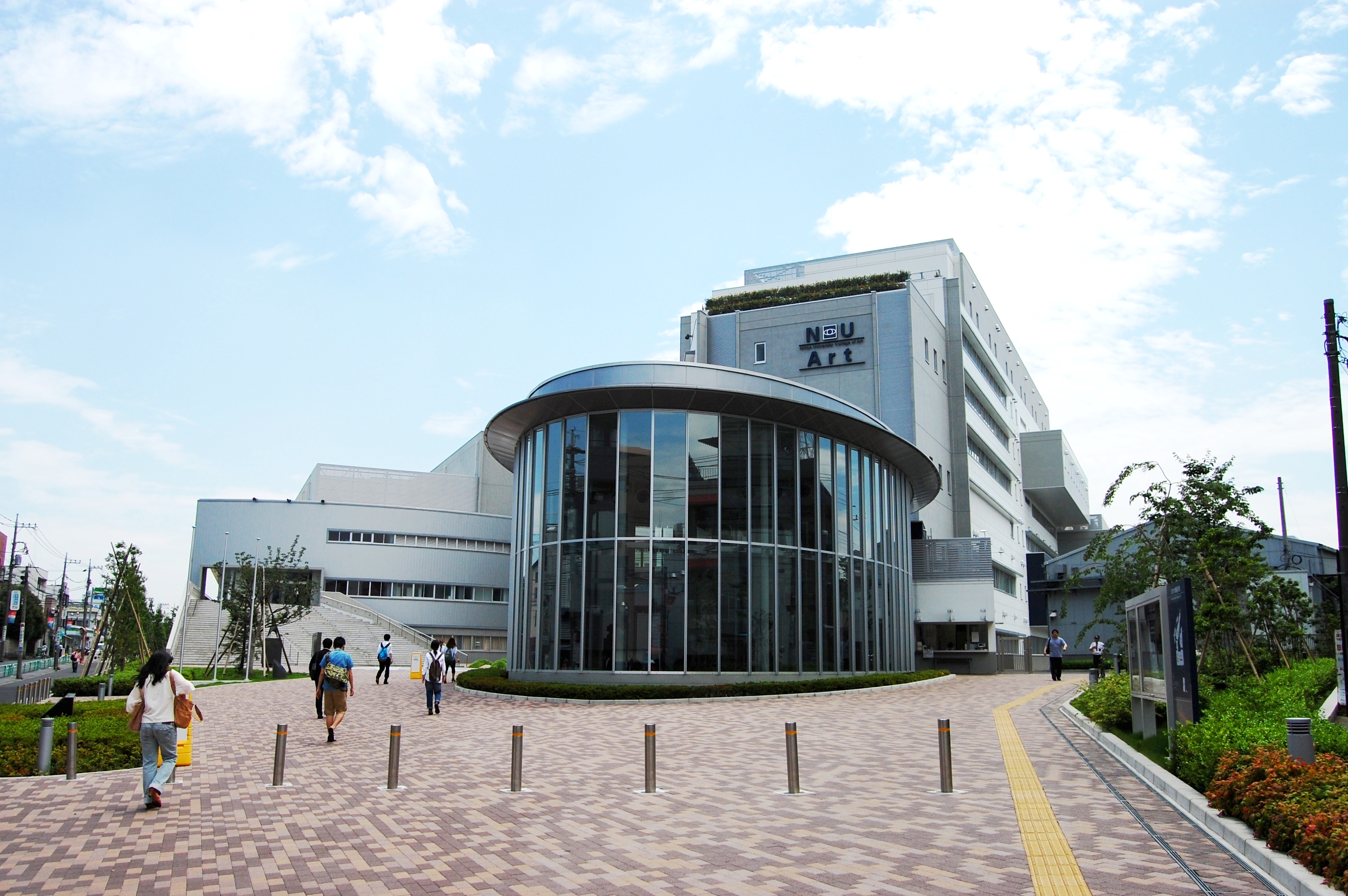
Nihon University Nerima campus

- College of Art (1921-; Nerima, Tokyo & Tokorozawa, Saitama)
  - Photography / Cinema / Fine Arts / Music / Literary Arts / Drama / Broadcasting / Design
- College of International Relations (1978-; Mishima, Shizuoka)
  - International Relations / Intercultural Relations / Global Exchange Studies / International Business and Information
- College of Science and Technology (1920-; Chiyoda, Tokyo & Funabashi, Chiba)
  - Civil Engineering / Transportation Engineering and Socio-Technology / Architecture / Oceanic Architecture and Engineering / Mechanical Engineering / Precision Machinery Engineering / Aerospace Engineering / Electrical Engineering / Electronics and Computer Science / Materials and Applied Chemistry / Physics / Mathematics
- College of Industrial Technology (1952-; Narashino, Chiba)
  - Mechanical Engineering / Electrical and Electronic Engineering / Civil Engineering / Architecture and Architectural Engineering / Applied Molecular Chemistry / Industrial Engineering and Management / Mathematical Information Engineering / Liberal Arts and Basic Science
- College of Engineering (1947-; Koriyama, Fukushima)
  - Civil Engineering / Architecture / Mechanical Engineering / Electrical and Electronics Engineering / Materials Chemistry and Engineering / Computer Science
- School of Medicine (1925-; Itabashi, Tokyo)
  - Medicine
- School of Dentistry (1921-; Chiyoda, Tokyo)
  - Dentistry
- School of Dentistry at Matsudo (1971-; Matsudo, Chiba)
  - Dentistry
- College of Bioresource Science (1943-; Fujisawa, Kanagawa)
  - Plant Science and Resources / Animal Sciences and Resources / Marine Sciences and Resources / Forest Sciences and Resources / Bioenvironmental and Agricultural Resources / Food Science and Technology / Agricultural and Biological Chemistry / Applied Biological Sciences / Food Economics / International Development Studies / Veterinary Medicine
- College of Pharmacy (1952-; Narashino, Chiba)
  - Pharmacy / Biological Pharmacy
- Correspondence Division (1948-; Chiyoda, Tokyo)

=== Graduate schools ===
- Advanced Research Institute for the Sciences and Humanities
- Graduate School of Law
- Graduate School of Liberal Arts
- Graduate School of Science and Technology
- Graduate School of Integrated Basic Sciences
- Graduate School of Economics
- Graduate School of Commerce
- Graduate School of Art
- Graduate School of International Relations
- Graduate School of Industrial Technology
- Graduate School of Engineering
- Graduate School of Medicine
- Graduate School of Dentistry
- Graduate School of Dentistry at Matsudo
- Graduate School of Bioresource Science
- Graduate School of Pharmacy
- Graduate School of Business
- Graduate School of Social and Cultural Studies
- Law School

== Teaching staff ==
See Academic staff of Nihon University

== Alumni ==
- Abe Shuji, President and CEO of Yoshinoya
- Akio Mori, physiologist and writer
- Akira Gomi, photographer
- Ayumu Nakajima, actor
- Banana Yoshimoto, writer
- Andrijana Cvetkovik, Macedonian film director, writer, and Ambassador to Japan
- C. W. Nicol, environmentalist
- Daishōmaru Shōgo, sumo wrestler
- Daisuke Ono, voice actor
- Takehiko Orimo, basketball player
- Dong Biwu, Chinese communist revolutionary, Acting President of the People's Republic of China (1972–1975)
- Endō Shōta, sumo wrestler
- Hamanoshima Keishi, sumo wrestler
- Hidenoumi Takuya, sumo wrestler
- Higonoumi Naoya, sumo wrestler
- Hiroko Mima, Miss Japan Universe and 15th runner-up for Miss Universe
- Hiroshi Suga, photographer
- Hiroshi Watanabe, photographer
- Hiroshi Yamazaki, photographer
- Hiroyuki Sanada, actor and martial artist
- Ian Buruma, writer
- Ichiro Ozawa, statesman*
- Ishiura Masakatsu, sumo wrestler
- Jōkōryū Takayuki, sumo wrestler
- Jun Konno, judo wrestler
- Junya Koizumi, statesman
- Kei Tomiyama, voice actor*
- Ken Domon, photographer*
- Kentaro Miura, mangaka
- Kishin Shinoyama, photographer
- Kōji Mori, mangaka
- Kōichi Hamada, politician
- Kōtarō Iizawa, photographic critic
- Kotomitsuki Keiji, sumo wrestler
- Kyu Mogami, professional wrestler
- Kyuichi Tokuda, lawyer, politician, leader of the Japanese Communist Party (1945–1950)
- Mainoumi Shūhei, sumo wrestler
- Makoto Hasegawa, basketball player
- Makoto Koga, statesman
- Makoto Takimoto, judo wrestler
- Masato Matsuura, CEO of Avex Group
- Maximo Blanco, wrestler; professional Mixed Martial Artist in the UFC's Featherweight Division
- Megumi Han, Voice actress and singer
- Miyako Matsumoto, actress and professional wrestler
- Remi Matsuo, musician and artist
- Saori Izawa, actress and stunt performer
- Satoyama Kōsaku, sumo wrestler
- Shoji Meguro, video game music composer
- Sido Nakamura, actor*
- Takamisakari Seiken, sumo wrestler
- Takashi Sasano, actor*
- Tetsuya Ichimura, photographer*
- Tomoyuki Furumaya, film director
- Toru Yano, professional wrestler
- Toshiaki Kasuga, comedian
- Toshiaki Okamura, baseball player and coach
- Tsutomu Sato, statesman
- Wajima Hiroshi, sumo wrestler, the 54th yokozuna
- Yasu Urano, professional wrestlers
- Yasuaki Kurata, actor and martial artist
- Yasuhiro Sonoda, statesman
- Yoshikazu Tanaka, CEO and Founder of GREE Inc.
- Yoshino Ōishi, photojournalist
- Yoshinobu Nishizaki, animator
- Yoshinofuji Naoya, sumo wrestler
- Yoshisada Yonezuka, 9th Dan (Kudan) Judo Instructor
- Yoshiyuki Tomino, animator
- Yui Hasegawa, footballer
- Yutaka Takanashi, photographer
- Yutaka Yaguchi, 9th Dan Shotokan Karate Master
- Seba Jun, musician, producer

== Controversies ==
=== American football team scandals ===
==== Dirty tackle ====
In May 2018, at an American football game between the Nihon University Phoenix and the Kwansei Gakuin University Fighters, a Nihon University team member violently tackled an opposing team member from behind after play was over. The tackled Kwansei Gakuin team member received an injury in his back ligaments as a result, and had to take a month out from football to recover. A third-party committee convened by Nihon University to investigate the incident found that the Nihon University team's coach and assistant coach had instructed a team member to dirty-tackle that particular player on the Kwansei Gakuin team. Furthermore, another independent investigation, by the Kantoh Collegiate American Football Association, reached the same conclusion, and expelled the coaches from the Association. Nihon University reached an out-of-court settlement with the injured Kwansei Gakuin team player. A decision by Tokyo's Metropolitan Police Department not to prosecute the coaches was harshly criticized by those who had carried out the above investigations.

==== Drug possession ====
Three members of the Nihon University American football team were arrested between August and November 2023 for suspicion of using cannabis. In August 2023 police searched the team's dormitory after the university found pieces of a plant and pills there the previous month. The university suspended the team's activities in September following the first arrest. Following a second arrest in October, it was reported that notes from an August meeting of university executives suggested ten or more members of the American football team may have used cannabis.

In November 2023 the Nihon University Board of Trustees recommended the resignation of its President Takeo Sakai and its Vice President Yasuhiro Sawada, while Trustees Chair Mariko Hayashi agreed to a 50% pay cut. Soon after a third person was arrested, Japanese news sources reported that Nihon University planned to disband its American football team after a history of 83 years, during which it won the Koshien Bowl 21 times and the Rice Bowl four times. A third-party investigation into how the matter was handled, led by lawyer Hideaki Kubori, suggested a culture of secrecy and xenophobia on the part of university officials.

=== Alleged tax evasion by Chairman of the Board ===
On 29 November 2021, the former chairman of the board of Nihon University, Hidetoshi Tanaka, was arrested for alleged tax evasion, and indicted by prosecutors on 20 December. Tanaka had allegedly received approximately 118 million yen in bribes from 2018 to 2020 paid by contractors in return for contracts being awarded for work at Nihon University. He had allegedly failed to declare the money as income, thus allegedly evading payment of approximately 52 million yen in tax. Tanaka announced his resignation on December 1, 2021. By accepting his resignation rather than dismissing him, the board ensured that Tanaka would remain eligible for a retirement bonus of hundreds of millions of yen.

== See also ==
- Casals Hall, a chamber music venue owned by Nihon University
