= Kanendo Watanabe =

Japanese photographer

Kanendo Watanabe (渡辺兼人, Watanabe Kanendo; born 1947) is a Japanese photographer.
