= Ken Domon Museum of Photography =

Photographic art museum in Sakata, Japan

- 土門拳記念館
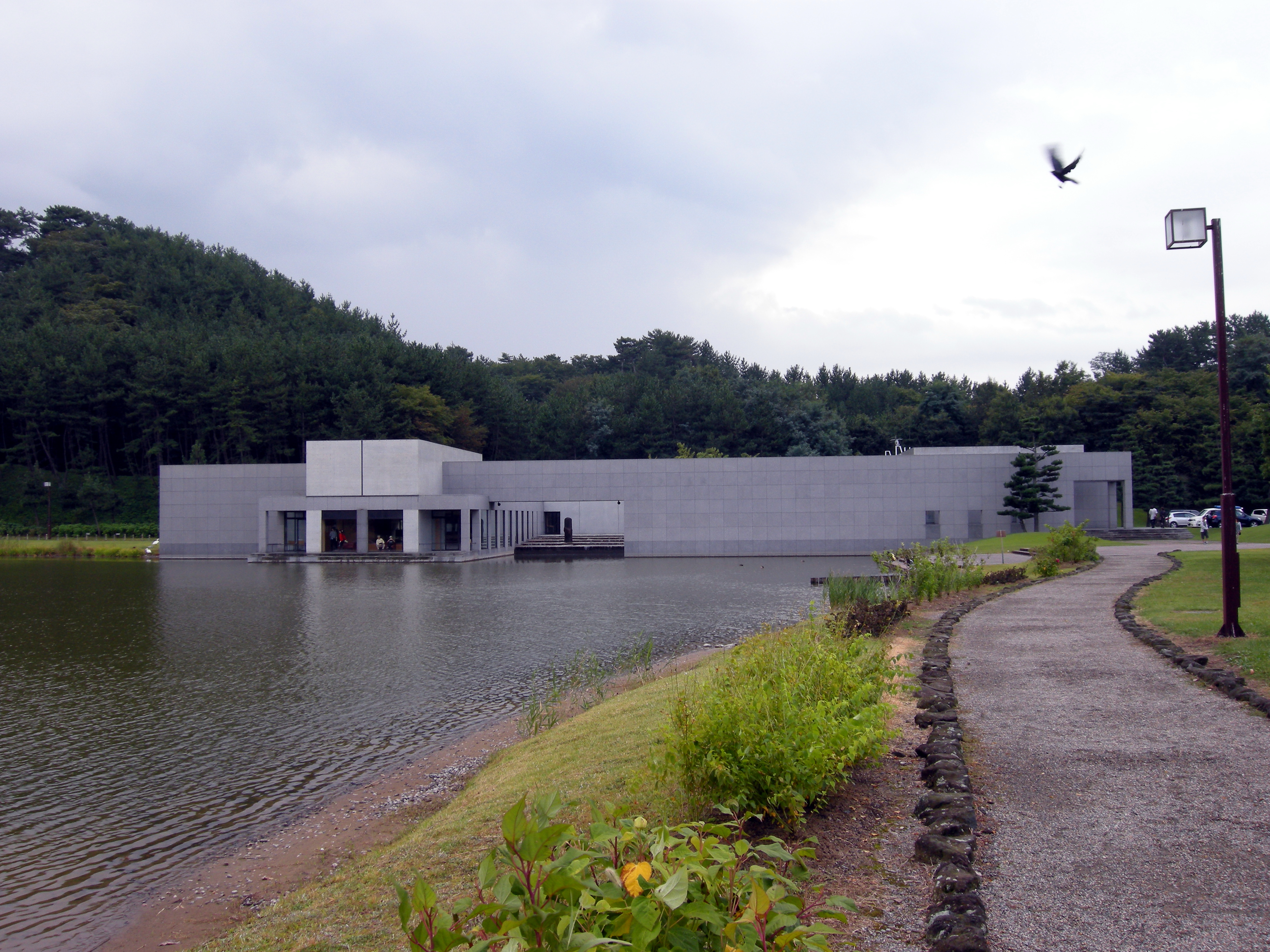

General information
- Location: 2-14 Iimoriyama, Sakata, Yamagata Prefecture, Japan
- Coordinates: 38.891299°N 139.823716°E
- Opened: October 10, 1983

Technical details
- Floor count: 2 above ground
- Floor area: 2,054.39 m2

Design and construction
- Architect: Yoshio Taniguchi

Website
- www.domonken-kinenkan.jp

The Ken Domon Museum of Photography (土門拳記念館, Domon Ken kinenkan) was opened in 1983 in Sakata, Yamagata (Japan), the birthplace of the photographer Ken Domon.

On the occasion of becoming the first honorary citizen of Sakata in 1974, Domon donated his entire collection of works to the town. This prompted the decision to build a museum in his honour, and it was the first museum dedicated to photography in Japan.

The museum has about 70,000 prints of works by Domon. It also has works by winners of the Domon Ken Award and another prize, the Domon Ken Cultural Award (土門拳文化賞, Domon Ken Bunka-shō)) which is presented by the city in Domon's honour.

The museum building was designed by noted architect Yoshio Taniguchi, and won the 9th Isoya Yoshida Award in 1984.

== See also ==
- List of museums devoted to one photographer
