= Eiki Mori =

Japanese photographer

- Born: 1976 (age 49–50); Kanazawa, Japan
- Education: Parsons The New School for Design
- Known for: photography
- Movement: contemporary photography
- Website: www.eikimori.com//

Eiki Mori (森 栄喜, Mori Eiki) is a Japanese photographer, known for exploring male sexuality.

== Biography ==
Eiki Mori was born in Kanazawa, Japan in 1976. Mori graduated from the photography department of Parsons The New School for Design in New York City. In 2011, Mori launched OSSU - the first Japanese magazine to explore male sexuality. He won the 39th Kimura Ihei Award in 2014 for "intimacy" portraits. Eiki Mori lives and works in Tokyo.

== Exhibitions ==
=== Solo ===
- 1998 "Symphonic Flowers", Gallery 888, Kanazawa
- 2006 "A Perfect Morning", Punctum, Tokyo
- 2010 "You See Rainbows" Kaori-za, Tokyo
- 2011 "tokyo boy alone" good cho's, mezamashikohi urban, Wombbloc Arts, Taiwan
- 2012 "tokyo boy alone / intimacy" Monash University Prato Centre, Italy
- 2013 "intimacy" Zen Foto Gallery, Tokyo
- 2013 "intimacy" chef d'oeuvre, Osaka
- 2014 "intimacy" IMA Books Gallery, Tokyo
- 2014 "The 39th Kimura Ihei Award Exhibition intimacy" Konica Minolta Plaza Gallery C, Tokyo
- 2014 "The 39th Kimura Ihei Award Exhibition intimacy" Kapo Gallery, Kanazawa

=== Group ===
- 2009 "I see you" Ithaca Public Art Gallery, Ithaca, Greece
- 2009 "I see you" Melina Cultural Center, Athens, Greece
- 2010 "Brand New Valentine" Mitsubishi-Jisho Artium, Fukuoka
- 2010 "Boy BANG Boy" East Gallery, London, UK
- 2011 "Homage to Pier Paolo Pasolini" Vanilla Gallery, Tokyo
- 2011 "Obscurite et Lumiere" Impossible Project Space Tokyo, Tokyo
- 2011 "POLAROID (IM)POSSIBLE - The Westlicht collection" WestLicht Photo Museum, Wien, Austria
- 2011 "boy's little worlds" Zen Foto Gallery, Tokyo
- 2011 "cum" VZ Gallery, London, UK
- 2012 "triple fantasy" Art Print Gallery, Tokyo
- 2012 "triple fantasy" NEW ACCIDENT, Kanazawa
- 2012 "triple fantasy" WHAT A VIEW mimi space, Taipei, Taiwan
- 2012 "The Polaroid Collection" NRW-Forum, Duesseldorf, Germany
- 2013 "FUORI POSTO(OUT OF PLACE)" Casa Masaccio Arte Contemporanea, San Giovanni Valdarno, Italy
- 2013 "edition.nord_exhibition_RE/source" space_inframince, Osaka
- 2014 "Absorption and Explosion" Videotage, Hong Kong, China
- 2015 "Wedding Politics" chef d'oeuvre, Osaka
- 2015 "Kimura Ihei Award 40th Anniversary Exhibition" The Kawasaki City Museum, Kanagawa
- 2016 "Fashioning Identity" Gallery Fleur - Kyoto Seika University, Kyoto

== Bibliography ==
- "Crows and Pearls". Edition Nord, Japan. 2009.
- "Tokyo boy alone". Revolution Star Publishing and Creation, Taiwan. 2011. ISBN 978-4904292150.
- "Intimacy". Nanarokusha Publishing, Japan. 2013. ISBN 978-4904292396.
- "Family Regained". Nanarokusha Publishing, Japan. 2017. ISBN 978-4904292785.
