= Tokyo Polytechnic University =

Private university in Honchō, Nakano, Tokyo

Coordinates: 35°41′25.86″N 139°40′50.80″E

- 東京工芸大学
- Atsugi Campus
- Type: Private
- Established: Founded 1923, Chartered 1966
- President: Nobuyuki Kobayashi
- Location: Tokyo, Japan
- Campus: Nakano, Tokyo, Atsugi, Kanagawa
- Website: www.t-kougei.ac.jp/e/

Tokyo Polytechnic University (東京工芸大学, Tōkyō Kōgei Daigaku) is a private university in Honchō 2-chōme, Nakano, Tokyo. Its nickname is Shadai (写大). It was formerly known as Tokyo College of Photography (東京写真大学, Tōkyō Shashin Daigaku).

The university was founded as Konishi Professional School of Photography in Shibuya in 1923. The founder, Rokuemon Sugiura VII, was the president of Konishi Main Shop (later Konica) at that time and founded the school to fulfil the wish of Rokuemon Sugiura VI, the previous president.

Since 2007, the university has offered courses in manga studies and animation studies. Tokyo Polytechnic is also notable for being one of the few universities in Japan to have a game design department, with its faculty including such notable practitioners as Pac-Man creator Toru Iwatani and Xevious creator Masanobu Endō. The university also operates the Suginami Animation Museum, which focuses on the history and future of the animation industry in Japan.

== Alumni ==
- Akitaro Daichi
- Eikoh Hosoe (photographer)
- Yoko Kamio
- Takashi Koizumi
- Mouna Karray (photographer)
- Kōichi Saitō (film director)
- Mutsuo Sugiura
- Sakae Tamura (photographer)
- Kenji Tsuruta
- Tsutomu Miyazaki
- Shin Yanagisawa (photographer)

== Academic staff ==
- Yoshino Ōishi, photojournalist
- Toru Iwatani, game designer, creator of Pac-Man
- Masanobu Endō, game designer, creator of Xevious and The Tower of Druaga
- Hideo Yoshizawa, game designer, known for work on Ninja Gaiden and Klonoa
- Jun Hatanaka, manga and woodblock artist
- Mitsuru Hongo, anime director
- Yuu Miyake, game composer
- Tomohiro Okada, creative producer and art curator.
