= Eiichi Moriwaki =

Japanese photographer

Eiichi Moriwaki (森脇 英一, Moriwaki Eiichi; fl. 1930s) was a Japanese photographer.

Almost nothing about Moriwaki is known. In the 1930s he was a member of the Osaka Camera Group (大阪カメラグループ Ōsaka Kamera Gurūpu) of Kiyoshi Koishi, and in the late thirties a member of Rōka Photography Club (浪華写真クラブ Rōka Shashin Kurabu).

The Tokyo Metropolitan Museum of Photography holds works by Moriwaki in its permanent collection.
