= Tadao Mitome =

Japanese photographer (1938–2022)

Tadao Mitome (三留 理男, Mitome Tadao; 1938 – 22 March 2022) was a Japanese photographer and photojournalist. He was one of a handful of photojournalists granted a permanent United Nations ID card.

== Early life ==
Mitome was born in 1938, in Sariwon, Kōkai-dō, Korea, Empire of Japan. In 1948 his family was repatriated to Sasebō-shi, Nagasaki Prefecture. While attending Yamaguchi Hagikōtō high school he would receive mentoring from Asahi Shimbun photojournalist Masaji Kadokawa.

In 1958 Mitome entered the Nihon University College of Art. In 1961 while still a student he would publish "Document: The Memories of Childhood Polio." In that same year his exhibition "Dead end: The Women of Chikuhō" would attract critical acclaim.

== Career ==
After dropping out of Nihon University College of Art Mitome travelled to Africa and Guinea to cover indigenous tribes. His other work would center on separatist conflicts in Palestine and Indochina through the 1960s as a freelance journalist.

He extensively covered the Sanrizuka Struggle through the late 60's, photographing the violent third clash between Zengakuren Students and riot police. Mitome was also involved in the production of the film Ranru no hata.

In 1981 his Acro photobook "Give me Something to Eat!" attracted wide acclaim, bringing attention to the ongoing famine among Turkana tribes in Kenya. His photobook "The Children who Transcend Borders" covering children living in conflict zones won the 1982 Ken Domon prize.

In 1988 Mitome won the 4th Africa/Asia award due to extensive work in both regions. In 1997 his photobook "People of the Remote - Asia's Modernization and Ethnic Minorities" was awarded the 9th Asia/Pacific award.

== Death ==
On March 22, 2022, Mitome died from prostate cancer in Shibuya, Tokyo.
