= Yurie Nagashima =

Japanese photographer (born 1973)

- Born: October 1973 (age 52–53); Nakano, Tokyo, Tokyo
- Education: California Institute of the Arts
- Known for: Photography, Contemporary Art
- Awards: PARCO Prize in URBANART #2, The 26th Kimura Ihei Photography Award, Kodansha Essay Award, Tokyo
- Website: https://yurienagashima.com/

Yurie Nagashima (長島 有里枝, Nagashima Yurie; born 1973) is a Japanese photographer, contemporary artist and writer working in the genres self-portraiture, portraiture, street photography, installation, research-based and still life. She is best known for raw and intimate portraits of home, family life and the everyday, locating her work in a broader feminist dialogue.

In 2000, Nagashima was awarded the prestigious Kimura Ihei Award. Nagashima is a lecturer at Tokyo and Musashino Universities, and a visiting professor at Kyoto Art University. Her book「僕らの女の子写真からわたしたちのガーリーフォトへ」 [From their “girls’ photography” to our girly photo] (2020) unpacked systemic gender bias in Japanese art criticism through discourse analysis.

== Early work ==
Yurie Nagashima rose to national fame in Japan after receiving the second annual Urbanart award hosted by the Parco Gallery in Tokyo in 1993 for a series of photographs depicting herself and her family in the nude. Nagashima was nominated for the award by Nobuyoshi Araki, one of Japan's best known photographers. At the time, Nagashima was still a student at Musashino Art University in Tokyo from where she graduated in 1995 with a BA in visual communication design. In 1995, Nagashima had a two-person exhibition with the American photographer Catherine Opie at the Parco Gallery, Tokyo. Following this encounter with Opie, Nagashima embarked on a MFA at the California Institute of the Arts under her supervision.

In at times provocative photographs, Nagashima has tested public perceptions on obscenity and censorship in Japan. Alongside photographers like Hiromix and Mika Ninagawa, they were important figures in a 90s photographic movement. This movement, influenced by cultural changes, point & shoot cameras, and 'Purikura' (Print Club) culture, featured Japanese teenagers, especially girls, creating a new visual style.

== Career ==
From 2000 to 2014, Nagashima was represented by the gallery SCAI the Bathhouse in Tokyo, where she had numerous solo and group exhibitions.

Nagashima is currently represented by MAHO KUBOTA GALLERY.

In addition to her work as a photographer, curator, lecturer, and writer, in August 2014, Nagashima was a Master at the International Summer School of Photography, in Latvia. She led a workshop titled 'Photography as a Subversive Tactic: Being the Other'.

In 2023, Nagashima created the School of Care at Minatomachi Art Table in Nagoya where she worked with participants from the public around the themes of well-being from a feminist perspective.

=== Photography Monographs ===
Nagashima has published numerous important photography monographs that deal with the family, gender, identity and sexuality, such as Senaka no kioku (2009) (literally translated, "Memories of a back" which hints at childhood where children are carried on their mother's backs). The series depicts biographical stories from her childhood.

Photobooks are an important format in the history of Japanese photography. This format became more important than prints starting in the 1960s due to the quality of design, printing and materials.

Nagashima's photobooks include:

- Yurie Nagashima Fuga, Tokyo, 1995. ISBN 4-89424-059-9.
- Empty White Room (エンプティホワイトルーム), Little More, Tokyo, 1995. ISBN 4-947648-17-1.
- Kazoku (家族) [A Family], Korinsha Press, Kyoto, 1998. ISBN 4-7713-0334-7.
- Pastime Paradise, Madra, Tokyo, 2000. ISBN 4-944079-23-0.
- not six, Switch, Tokyo, 2004. ISBN 4-88418-014-3.
- Senaka no Kioku (背中の記憶), Kodansha, Tokyo, 2009. ISBN 978-4-06-215896-1.
- Swiss, Akaaka, Tokyo, 2010. ISBN 4-903545-59-8.
- 5 comes after 6, MATCH and Company, Tokyo, 2014.
- Self-Portraits, Dashwood Books, New York, 2020.

=== Scholarly works ===
Nagashima wrote a book titled 「僕らの女の子写真からわたしたちのガーリーフォトへ」which was published by Daifukushorin in 2020. The work is based on her master's dissertation from Musashino University. She used discourse analysis to closely study the art criticism surrounding the 1990s photography movement that she was part of, to prove how a gender-biassed narrative dismissed the importance of her and others in the movement.

=== Curation ===
Nagashima curated a major show at the 21st Century Museum of Contemporary Art, Kanazawa called "Countermeasures Against Awkward Discourses: From the Perspective of Third Wave Feminism" from October 15, 2021—March 13, 2022.

=== Solo exhibitions ===
- 2022 “Where the gaze resides” DOMANI plus @ Aichi
- 2020 "B&W" Maho Kubota Gallery
- 2016 "about home" Maho Kubota Gallery
- 2015 "5 Comes After 6" UTRECHT, Tokyo
- 2011 "What I was supposed to see and what Isaw" 1223 GENDAIKAIGA, Tokyo
- 2010 "SWISS" SCAI THE BATHHOUSE, viewing space, Tokyo
- 2007 "a box named flower" lammfromm, Tokyo
- 2005 "Her Projects – memories of no one" KIRIN PLAZA OSAKA, Osaka
- 2004 "Candy Horror" SCAI THE BATHHOUSE, Tokyo
- 2004 "not six" NADiff, Tokyo
- 2000 "PASTIME PARADISE" SCAI THE BATHHOUSE, Tokyo
- 1999 "I want to be your power" California Institute of the Arts, California
- 1994 "Nagashima Yurie - A Room of Love-" P-House Gallery, Tokyo

=== Awards ===
- Kodansha Essay Award, Tokyo (2010)
- The 26th Kimura Ihei Photography Award, Tokyo (2001)
- PARCO Prize in URBANART #2, Tokyo (1993)
