= Kōji Satō (photographer) =

Japanese photographer

Kōji Satō (佐藤 虹児 or 佐藤 虹ニ, Satō Kōji; 1 November 1911 – 30 May 1955) was a renowned Japanese amateur photographer, particularly in the 1930s.

Chōkichi Satō (佐藤 長吉, Satō Chōkichi) was born in Kumagaya, Saitama on 1 November 1911. From the age of thirteen Satō had a Thornton reflex camera; on his graduation from school he took photographs in his free time from his work in a bicycle wholesaler. He was given the nom de guerre Kōji Satō (佐藤 虹児, Satō Kōji) when young.

From 1931 his photographs appeared in Camera and Shashin Geppō, and from 1933 in Shashin Salon. Satō's works were selected for the Golden Gate International Exposition in 1940.

After the war, Satō changed the characters for Kōji from 虹児 to 虹ニ. An energetic and widely exhibited portraitist before and during the war, Satō turned his camera to his parents and his children after the war.

Satō died of tuberculosis on 30 May 1955.

Some of Satō's photographs are in the permanent collection of the Tokyo Metropolitan Museum of Photography, the Houston Museum of Fine Arts, and Shimane Art Museum.

== Published photographs ==
- Nihon kindai shashin no seiritsu to tenkai (日本近代写真の成立と展開) / The Founding and Development of Modern Photography in Japan. Tokyo: Tokyo Museum of Photography, 1995. Plate 122: "Man in black cape" (黒マントの男, Kuromanto no otoko), 1937.
- Satō Kōji no shashin (佐藤虹ニの写真) / The Photographs of Koji Sato. N.p.: Kenji Satō, 2001. Captions and text in Japanese and English.
