= Eiki Berg =

Estonian politician

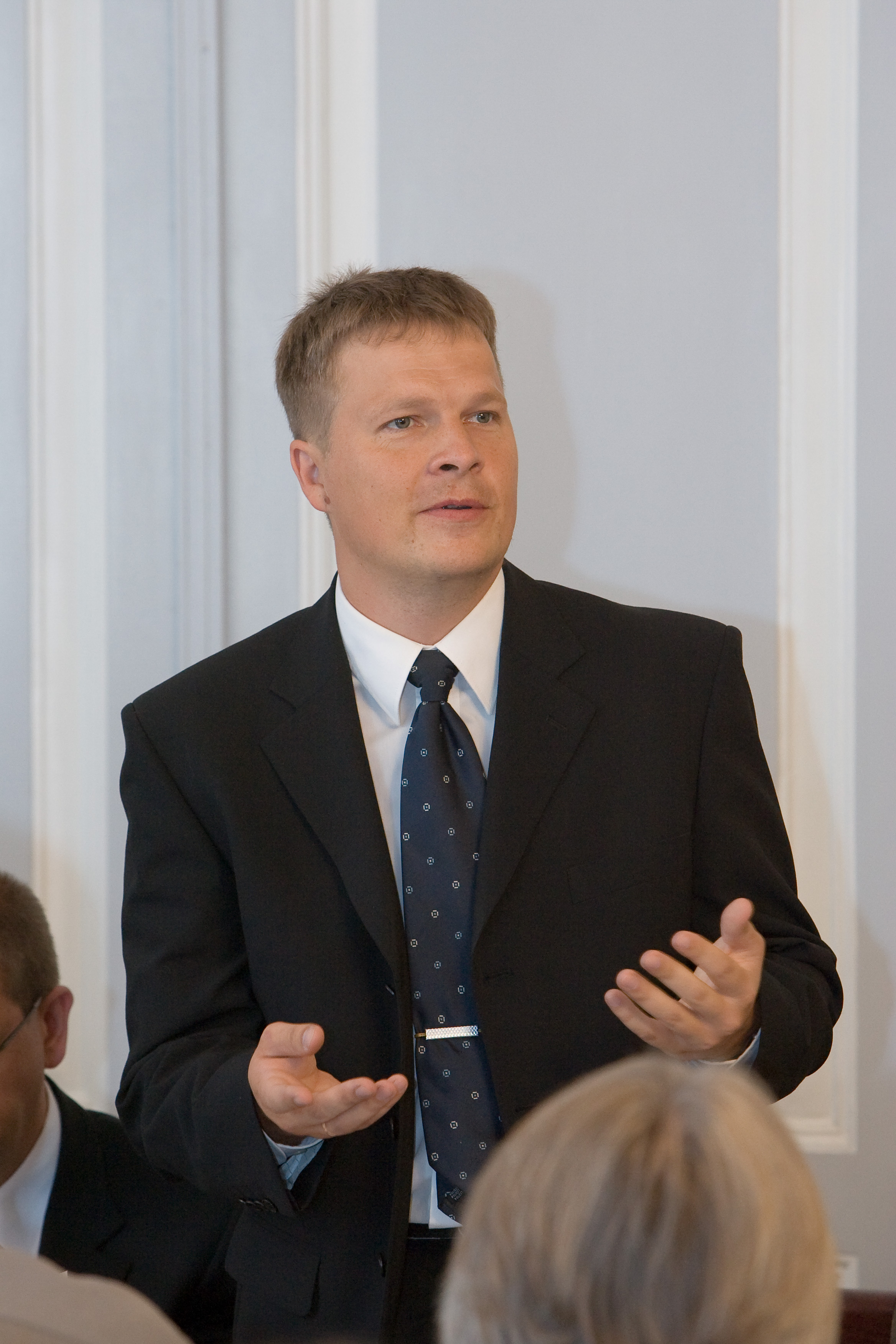
Eiki Berg in 2007

Eiki Berg (born 13 January 1970) is an Estonian political scientist, professor of the theory of international relations at the University of Tartu, and politician.

Berg was a member of the X Riigikogu, representing the Res Publica Party.
