= Sunday Mainichi =

Japanese weekly news magazine

- Logo from 2015 (cover banner shown)
- Categories: General news and current affairs
- Frequency: Weekly
- Circulation: 27,778
- Publisher: Mainichi Shimbun Publishing
- First issue: April 2, 1922
- Country: Japan
- Based in: Chiyoda, Tokyo
- Language: Japanese
- Website: mainichibooks.com/sundaymainichi/

Sunday Mainichi (Japanese: サンデー毎日, Hepburn: Sandē Mainichi) is a Japanese weekly general-interest magazine published by Mainichi Shimbun Publishing, a subsidiary of The Mainichi Newspapers. Launched on April 2, 1922, it is one of the two oldest weekly magazines in Japan, founded the same day as its long-term rival, the Shukan Asahi, which is now defunct.

== History ==
The magazine was inaugurated on April 2, 1922, as part of the 50th-anniversary commemorations of the Mainichi Shimbun and its predecessor The Osaka Mainichi, together with the English-language daily (now The Mainichi) and the Braille Mainichi. The competing Shukan Asahi debuted the same day, and the two are regarded as the oldest weekly magazines in Japan, considered 'fraternal twins' whose inaugural covers had photographs of the Tokyo Peace Exposition in Ueno Park. The first issue was printed in tabloid format, with four pages of gravure and twenty-four pages of text at a cover price of ten sen.

In 1925, the magazine ran what is considered as the first-ever crossword published in Japan. From 1926, the magazine ran a popular-literature contest, the Taishū Bungei-shō (大衆文芸賞, Popular Literature Prize), which helped launch the careers of writers including Yasushi Inoue and Sōhachi Yamaoka. During World War II, from February 1943, publication continued under the English-free title Weekly Mainichi (週刊毎日), reverting to Sunday Mainichi in January 1946.

Starting in 1963, the magazine serialized Toyoko Yamasaki's novel Shiroi Kyotō (The Great White Tower).

In April 2015, publication of the magazine was transferred to the newly created Mainichi Shimbun Publishing, a subsidiary of the Mainichi Newspapers. After Shukan Asahi ceased publication in May 2023, the Sunday Mainichi remained one of only a few weekly magazines in Japan still tied to a newspaper publisher, alongside AERA and Spa!.

In October 2026, Mainichi Shimbun Publishing announced that Sunday Mainichi will cease publishing in Abril 2027, citing high production costs and a diminishing market.

== Notable coverage ==
In June 1989, the magazine published the interview with a former Kagurazaka geisha, Mitsuko Nakanishi, in which she alleged a months-long paid liaison with newly appointed Prime Minister Sōsuke Uno. The story, headlined "SCOOP: A SCANDAL INVOLVING PRIME MINISTER UNO," was picked up by international media, contributing to Uno's resignation after 68 days in office and to the ruling party's defeat in the July 1989 House of Councillors election.

From 1989, the magazine developed an adversarial relationship with the Aum Shinrikyo cult, running a series of articles on it titled "The Insanity of Aum Shinrikyo" (オウム真理教の狂気). Reporter Shoko Egawa, who tracked the cult from its onset, noted that within 18 months of Aum's incorporation it faced no fewer than 60 civil and criminal lawsuits, and that groups of cultists began invading newspaper and magazine offices. According to a retrospective published by the magazine in 2010, its coverage so angered the cult's founder, Shoko Asahara, that Aum planned to bomb the Mainichi Shimbun's offices and to assassinate the magazine's then-editor, Tarō Maki.

In 2008, the Imperial Household Agency lodged a protest over a February 3 article on Empress Michiko, saying the piece contained claims that were not factual. In 2016, the Osaka High Court upheld a lower ruling that a 2014 article on politician Tomomi Inada did not defame her, dismissing her damages suit against the magazine's publisher.

== Photography and features ==
Following Aoyagi's 1995 proposal to Mitsubishi Motors, the magazine serialized his "From the Roads of the World" (世界の道から) series, travel photographs taken from a Mitsubishi Pajero, from the January 7, 1996 issue over roughly two years. The magazine maintains regular columns on education and university entrance examinations, including the annual "University Admissions Results" special editions compiled jointly with the data firm Daigaku Tsushin.

== See also ==
- Mainichi Shimbun
- Shiroi Kyotō
- Weekly magazines in Japan
