= Michiko Matsumoto =

Japanese photographer

- 松本 路子
- Born: 1950 (age 75–76)
- Education: Hosei University
- Known for: Photography
- Notable work: Yayoi Kusama, Tokyo
- Website: www.matsumotomichiko.com

Michiko Matsumoto (松本 路子, Matsumoto Michiko; born 1950) is a Japanese photographer known for her images of ūman ribu (women's liberation movement) activities.

== Biography ==
Michiko Matsumoto was born in Shizuoka Prefecture, Japan, in 1950. In the early 1970s, she attended women's liberation gatherings and published the photographs she took there. In 1978, she published a collection of photographs of the feminist movement titled のびやかな女たち/ Women Come Alive.

In 1974 Matsumoto graduated from Hosei University (Tokyo).

In the later 1970s, she travelled to locations including New York and Paris to photograph prominent feminists, artists and dancers. Michiko's work aimed to counter the presentation of women's bodies in mass media and to show community.

She has published 13 books of photography. Her works are in the collections of a number of museums internationally. She is currently based in Tokyo.

== Exhibitions ==
=== Selected solo exhibitions ===
- 1974 "Yoko Ono in New York" 3points, Tokyo
- 1978 "Women Come Alive" Pepe, Tokyo
- 1978 "In South East Asia" Hankyu Art Gallery, Osaka
- 1981 "Niki de Saint Phalle" Space Niki, Tokyo
- 1983 "Portraits of New York Women" Parco Gallery, Tokyo, Sapporo
- 1986 "Niki de Saint Phalle" Parco SR6, Tokyo
- 1988 "Portraits ~ Women Artists" Soho Photo Gallery, New York U.S.A
- 1989 "Portraits of Dancers 1" Gallery Selare, Tokyo
- 1990 "Portraits of Women Artists" Keihan Art Gallery, Osaka
- 1990–1998 "Portraits of Dancers 2–5" Gallery Selare, Tokyo
- 1998 "Dancers" Dentsu Kosan Gallery, Tokyo
- 1999 "Nicolas Le Rishe in Paris" Gallery Selare, Tokyo
- 2000 "White on White" Heart & Color, Tokyo
- 2001 "Ruzimatov in St. Petersburg" Egg Gallery, Tokyo
- 2002 "Homage to Niki de Saint Phalle" Gallery Colorium, Tokyo, Prinz, Kyoto
- 2004 "Meditative Body, Awaked City" Gallery 21, Tokyo
- 2004 "Sessions" Zeit-Foto Salon, Tokyo
- 2005 "Rose Passion" Gallery Colorium, Tokyo
- 2007 "Cloths with Soul" Gallery le bain, Tokyo
- 2007 "Meditative Body — from St. Petersburg" Gallery Tosei, Tokyo
- 2009 "The Name of Roses" Junkudo, Tokyo
- 2010 "The Witches Tea Party" (Portraits of Niki de Saint Phalle) Tokinowasuremono, Tokyo
- 2013 "Les Femmes Artistes" LIBRAIRIE 6
- 2016 "Portraits " The Museum of Contemporary Art Karuizawa, Nagano

=== Selected group exhibitions ===
- 1987 "Contemporary Japanese Photography" Toured Europe
- 1988 "Faces of 20th Century by Distinguished Photographers" Asahi Gallery, Tokyo
- 1990 "Women Photographers" Nikon Salon, New York,
- 1995 "Objects, faces and Anti-Narratives" Tokyo Metropolitan Museum of Photography
- 1998-2000 "Women Photographers from Japan" Toured U.S.A.
- 2003 "Mon Paris" Gallery 21, Tokyo
- 2006 "Photographs of Kazuo Oono" Fukushima Photo Museum
- 2007 "Works from the Photographic Art in Japan" Shanghai Art Museum, China
- 2008 "Visions des Artistes Feminines" Gallery 21, Tokyo
- 2008 "Esprit de Paris" Gallery 21, Tokyo
- 2008 "Vision of America III" Tokyo Metropolitan Museum of Photography
- 2010 "Onna Tachidomaranai Jyoseitachi "(Tokyo Metropolitan Museum of Photography)
- 2010 "Human Images of 20th Century ~All photographs are portraits~"(Tokyo Metropolitan Museum of Photography)

== Publications ==
- Nobiyaka onna-tachi のびやかな女たち) / Women Come Alive. Tokyo: Hanashi no Tokushū-sha, 1978. (in English and Japanese) Portraits of women
- Michiko Matsumoto Ballet: 5 September 1981. Singapore: National Theatre Trust, 1981. (in English)
- Shōzō Nyūyōku no onna-tachi (肖像ニューヨークの女たち) / Portraits of New York women. Tokyo: Tōjusha, 1983. (in Japanese)
- Ochiai Keiko, Matsumoto Michiko no heya (落合恵子・松本路子の部屋) / Série Chambre 4. Tokyo: Ōbunsha, 1985. ISBN 4-01-071344-5. (in Japanese) With Keiko Ochiai.
- Niki do Sanfāru (ニキ・ド・サンファール) / Portrait of Niki de Saint Phalle. Tokyo: Parco, 1986. ISBN 4-89194-127-8. (in English) (in Japanese) About Niki de Saint Phalle.
- Portraits: Josei ātisto no shōjō (Portraits 女性アーティストの肖像) / Portraits: Women Artists. Tokyo: Kawade Shobo Shinsha, 1995. ISBN 4-309-90152-2. (in Japanese)
- Dancers: Erosu no shōjō (Dancers エロスの肖像). Kodansha, 1998. ISBN 4-06-209239-5 (in Japanese) Portraits of dancers.
- Portraits: 54-nin no josei ātisto-tachi (Portraits 54人の女性アーティストたち). Kyoto: Kyōto Shoin, 1999. ISBN 4-7636-1745-1. (in Japanese) Portraits of 54 women artists.
- Haretara bara hiyori (晴れたらバラ日和) / Rose Passion. Kyoto: Tankōsha, 2005. ISBN 4-473-03246-9. (in Japanese)
- Tamashii no nuno: Monsūn-Ajia 12-jin no josei-sakka-tachi (魂の布 モンスーンアジア12人の女性作家たち). Tankōsha, 2007. ISBN 978-4-473-03410-6. (in Japanese) Portraits of 12 women artists of "monsoon Asia".
- Yōroppa bara no namae o meguru tabi (ヨーロッパ バラの名前をめぐる旅) / The Seven Roses Story. Tokyo: Media Factory, 2009. ISBN 978-4-8401-2711-0. (in Japanese)
- "Nippon no Bara"(Japanese Wild Roses)(日本のバラ), Tankosha,2012
- "Tokyo Sakura 100 ka "(100 Cherry Blossoms in Tokyo) (東京桜100花), Tankosha,2015
- "Sarasa" (Printed Cotton in the World) (更紗), Tankosha,2016

== Public collections ==
- Tokyo Metropolitan Museum of Photography, Tokyo
- Bibliothèque Nationale, Paris
- Museum of Liberty Osaka, Osaka
- Museum of Josei University, Tokyo
- Niki Museum, Nasu, Tochigi
- The National Museum of Modern Art, Tokyo
- The Museum of contemporary Art Karuizawa, Nagano, Karuizawa
- Tokyo Opera City Art Gallery, Tokyo

== Sources ==
- Nihon shashinka jiten (日本写真家事典) / 328 Outstanding Japanese Photographers. Kyoto: Tankōsha, 2000. ISBN 4-473-01750-8. (in Japanese) Despite the English-language alternative title, all in Japanese.
