= Mitsuhiko Imamori =

Japanese photographer

Mitsuhiko Imamori (今森 光彦, Imamori Mitsuhiko; born 1954) is a self-taught Japanese photographer. His work often involves insects but he is a naturalist at heart.
