= Ikuo Nakamura =

Japanese photographer (born 1948)

Ikuo Nakamura (中村 征夫, Nakamura Ikuo; born July 1, 1948) is a Japanese photographer.
