= Tokyo Photographic Art Museum =

Gallery in Meguro, Tokyo, Japan

Coordinates: 35.6417°N 139.7132°E

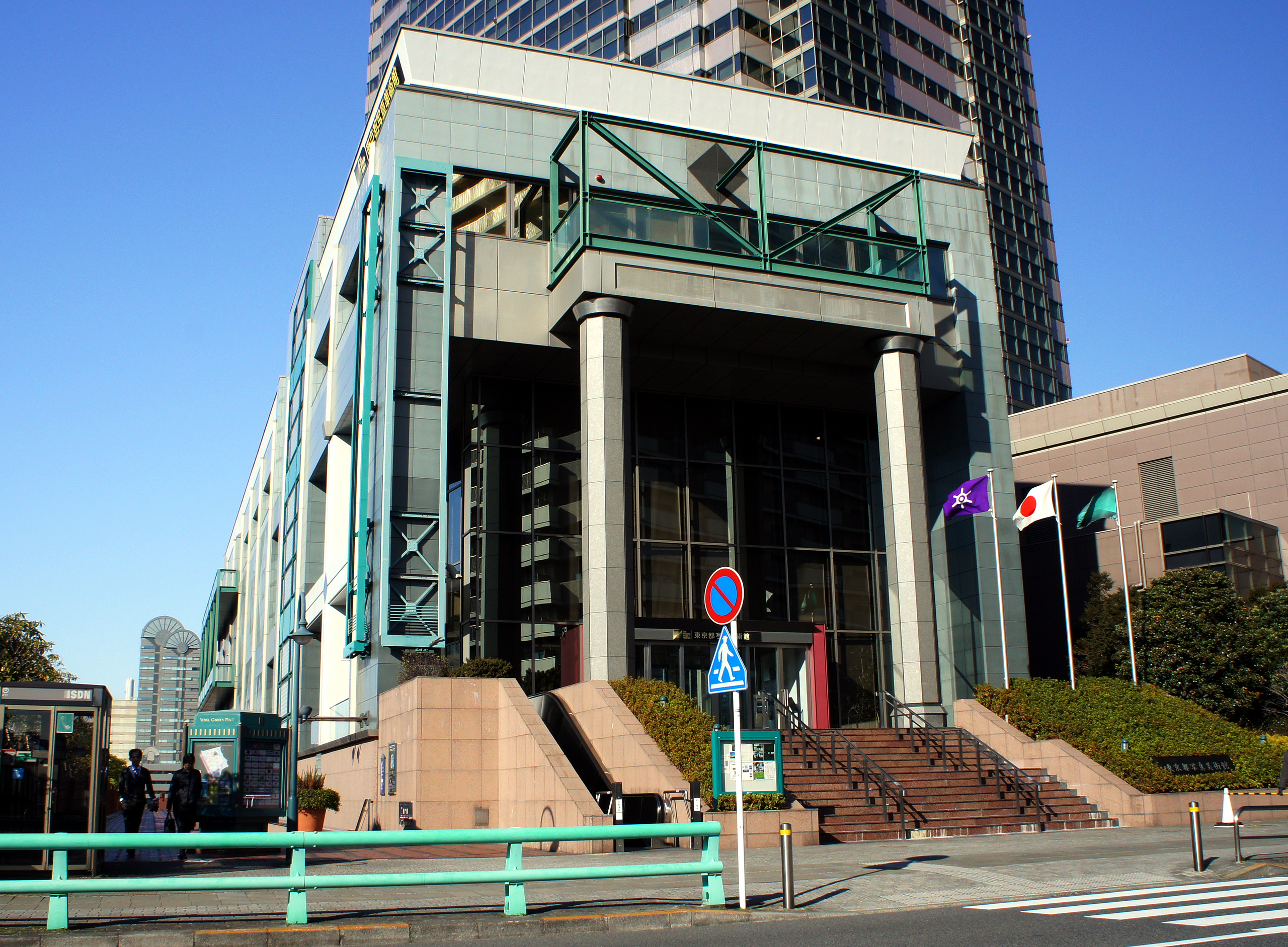

- Location within Tokyo Yamanote Loop Location within Tokyo wards area
- Established: 1990
- Location: Meguro, Tokyo, Japan
- Visitors: 415,000 (2008)
- Directors: Yoshiharu Fukuhara (2000–), See: Arinobu Fukuhara
- Website: topmuseum.jp

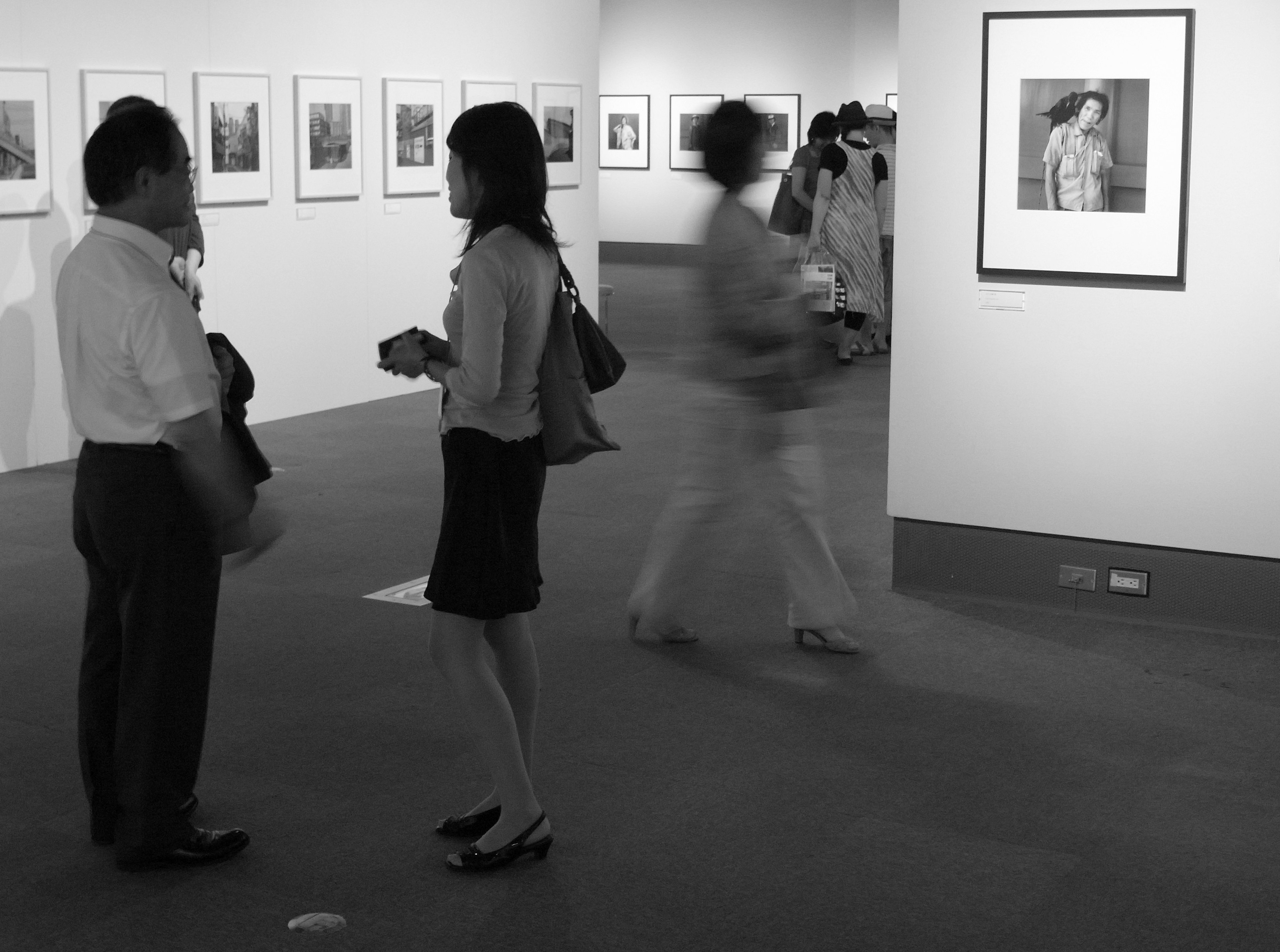
Basement exhibition room, August 2011

The Tokyo Photographic Art Museum (東京都写真美術館, Tōkyō-to Shashin Bijutsukan) is an art museum concentrating on photography.

As the Tokyo Metropolitan Museum of Photography, it was founded by the Tokyo Metropolitan Government, and is in Meguro-ku, a short walk from Ebisu station in southwest Tokyo. The museum also has a movie theater.

Until 2014, the museum nicknamed itself "Syabi" (pronounced shabi); since 2016, it has called itself "Top Museum".

== History and exhibitions ==
The Tokyo Metropolitan Museum of Photography opened in a temporary building in 1990 and moved to its current building in Yebisu Garden Place in 1995. At that time, it was one of the first photography galleries in Japan not to be dedicated to the works of a single photographer. Most of the exhibitions since then have been themed rather than devoted to a single photographer, but exhibitions have been dedicated to such photographers of the past as Berenice Abbott (1990) and Tadahiko Hayashi (1993–94), and also to living photographers including Martin Parr (2007) and Hiromi Tsuchida (2008).

In order to appeal to children as well as adults, the gallery holds exhibitions of anime and video games. The library of the gallery has a substantial collection of books of photographs.

As of late 2008, the gallery has no printed catalogue or electronic catalogue available externally. However, the book 328 Outstanding Japanese Photographers presents a comment on and a small reproduction of a sample photograph of each of over three hundred photographers represented in the permanent collection of the gallery at the turn of the millennium. Most of the individual exhibitions are accompanied by printed catalogues; as is customary in Japan, most of these lack ISBNs and are not distributed as are regular books, their sales instead being limited to the museum itself.

Photographers whose work is included in the permanent collection include Shihachi Fujimoto, Bruce Gilden, Hisae Imai, Takeji Iwamiya, Akira Komoto, Motoichi Kumagai, Seiji Kurata, Michiko Matsumoto, Aizō Morikawa, Eiichi Moriwaki, Tadayuki Naitoh, Kiyoshi Nishiyama, Yoshino Ōishi, Kōji Satō, Tokihiro Satō, Bukō Shimizu, Mieko Shiomi, Teikō Shiotani, Raghubir Singh, Yutaka Takanashi, Toyoko Tokiwa, Haruo Tomiyama, Kansuke Yamamoto and others.

The museum was closed for renovation from September 24, 2014, to the end of August 2016.

As of 2016, there is no entrance charge for the building or its research facilities, but each exhibition has an entrance charge.

In 2022, the museum presented Avant-Garde Rising: The Photographic Vanguard in Modern Japan.
