= Japanese pavilion =

Venice Biennale national pavilion

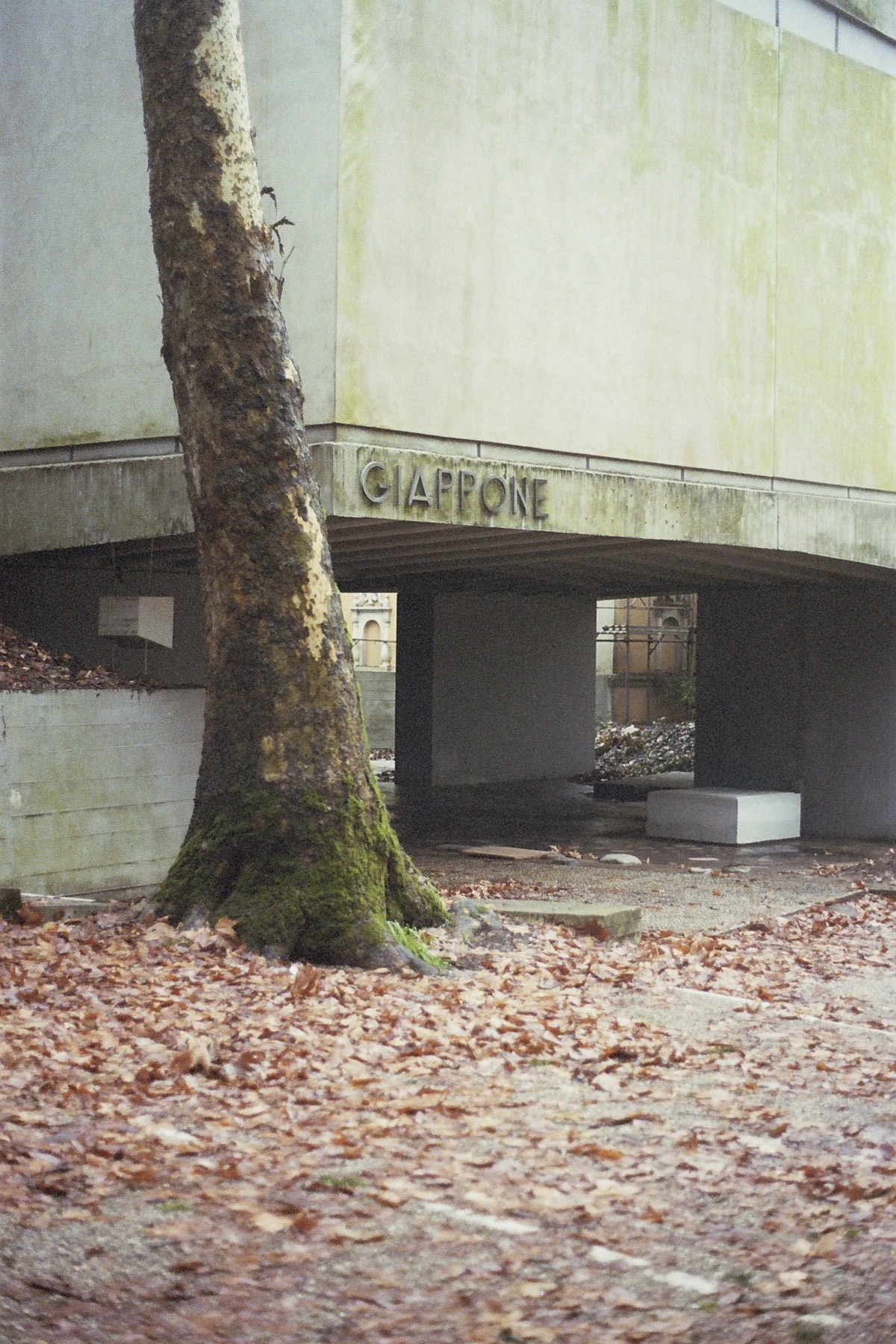
Japanese pavilion at the Venice biennial

The Japanese pavilion houses Japan's national representation during the Venice Biennale arts festivals.

== Background ==
The Venice Biennale is an international art biennial exhibition held in Venice, Italy. Often described as "the Olympics of the art world", participation in the Biennale is a prestigious event for contemporary artists. The festival has become a constellation of shows: a central exhibition curated by that year's artistic director, national pavilions hosted by individual nations, and independent exhibitions held throughout Venice. The Biennale's parent organisation also runs regular festivals in other arts: architecture, dance, film, music and theatre.

Outside the central international exhibition, individual nations produce their own shows, known as pavilions, as their national representation. Nations that own their pavilion buildings – such as the 30 housed in the Giardini – are responsible for their own upkeep and construction costs as well. Nations without dedicated buildings create pavilions in venues throughout the city.

== Organization and building ==
The pavilion, designed by Takamasa Yoshizaka, was built between 1955 and 1956.

== Representation by year ==
=== Art ===
- 1952 — Taikan Yokoyama, Kokei Kobayashi, Kiyotaka Kaburaki, Heihachirō Fukuda, Kyujin Yamamoto, Kenji Yoshioka, Sotaro Yasui, Shinsen Tokuoka, Ryuzaburo Umehara, Ichiro Fukuzawa, Kigai Kawaguchi
- 1954 — Hanjiro Sakamoto, Taro Okamoto
- 1956 — Kunitaro Suda, Kazu Wakita, Takeo Yamaguchi, Shigeru Ueki, Toyoichi Yamamoto, Shiko Munakata
- 1958 — Ichirō Fukuzawa, Kawabata Ryūshi, Seison Maeda, Kenzo Okada, Yoshi Kinouchi, Shindō Tsuji (representative: Shūzō Takiguchi; assistant commissioner: Ichirō Fukuzawa and Yoshiaki Tōno)
- 1960 — Toshimitsu Imai, Yoshishige Saito, Kei Sato, Kaoru Yamaguchi, Tadahiro Ono, Tomonori Toyofuku, Yoshitatsu Yanagihara, Yozo Hamaguchi
- 1962 — Kinuko Emi, Minoru Kawabata, Kumi Sugai, Tadashi Sugimata, Ryokichi Mukai
- 1964 — Yoshishige Saito, Toshinobu Onosato, Hisao Domoto, Tomonori Toyofuku
- 1966 — Toshinobu Onosato, Masuo Ikeda, Morio Shinoda, Ay-O
- 1968 — Tomio Miki, Kumi Sugai, Jiro Takamatsu, Katsuhiro Yamaguchi
- 1970 — Shusaku Arakawa and Nobuo Sekine
- 1972 — Kenji Usami, Shintaro Tanaka
- 1976 — Kishin Shinoyama
- 1978 — Koji Enokura, Kishio Suga
- 1980 — Koji Enokura, Susumu Koshimizu, Isamu Wakabayashi
- 1982 — Naoyoshi Hikosaka, Yoshio Kitayama, Tadashi Kawamata
- 1984 — Kosho Ito, Kyoji Takubo, Kosai Hori
- 1986 — Isamu Wakabayashi, Masafumi Maita
- 1988 — Shigeo Toya, Keiji Umematsu, Katsura Funakoshi
- 1990 — Toshikatsu Endo, Saburo Muraoka
- 1993 — Yayoi Kusama (Commissioner: Akira Tatehata)
- 1995 — Katsuhiko Hibino, Yoichiro Kawaguchi, Hiroshi Senju, Jae Eun Choi
- 1997 — Rei Naito
- 2003 — Yutaka Sone, Motohiko Odani
- 2005 — Miyako Ishiuchi (Commissioner: Michiko Kasahara)
- 2007 — Masao Okabe (Commissioner: Chihiro Minato)
- 2009 — Miwa Yanagi (Commissioner: Hiroshi Minamishima)
- 2011 — Tabaimo (Commissioner: Yuka Uematsu)
- 2013 — Koki Tanaka (Curator: Mika Kuraya)
- 2015 — Chiharu Shiota (Curator: Hitoshi Nakano)
- 2017 — Takahiro Iwasaki (Curator: Meruro Washida)
- 2019 — Motoyuki Shitamichi, Taro Yasuno, Toshiaki Ishikura, Fuminori Nousaku (Curator: Hiroyuki Hattori)
- 2022 — Dumb Type
- 2024 — Yuko Mohri (Curator: Sook-Kyung Lee)
- 2026 — Ei Arakawa-Nash (Curator: Horikawa Lisa and Takahashi Mizuki)

== Bibliography ==
- Russeth, Andrew (April 17, 2019). "The Venice Biennale: Everything You Could Ever Want to Know". ARTnews.
- Volpi, Cristiana (2013). "Japan". In Re Rebaudengo, Adele (ed.). Pavilions and Garden of Venice Biennale. Rome: Contrasto. p. 188. ISBN 978-88-6965-440-4.
