= Naoyoshi Hikosaka =

Naoyoshi Hikosaka (彦坂尚嘉, Hikosaka Naoyoshi, born June 26, 1946, Tokyo) is a Japanese artist and one of the founders of the activist group Bikyōtō. He was an artist-theorist who critiqued Mono-ha, worked in conceptualism in the first half of the 1970s, and turned to painting from the second half of the 1970s onward.

== Early life and Tama Art University ==
Hikosaka's youth was marked by health issues, suffering from tuberculosis and witnessing his younger brother's struggle with cerebral palsy. He experienced hospitalizing bouts of pleurisy and during the long periods of convalescence he read many books such as Soren Kierkegaard's Sickness Unto Death demonstrating an early interest in philosophy which would inform his future artistic practice. In his early art education beginning in elementary school, Hikosaka was tutored by the establishment oil painter Kiyohara Keiichi. He also attended night classes in painting taught by Koji Enokura at Suido Bata Academy while he was a high school student.

When he entered the oil painting department at Tama Art University in 1967 he was exposed to minimalism, experiencing what he calls a “Minimal Shock” that challenged art's material conventions. Along with this radical shift in his perception of art, at the university he also experienced the anti-war, anti-establishment, student protest movements associated with Zenkyoto that had spread all over Japan in the late 1960s. In July 1969 the Tama Art University students affiliated with the protest movement barricaded the school. In June the student group Zōkeidō, a forerunner of the later Bikyōtō group, organized a Zõkeidō exhibition inside the barricaded school. Hikosaka exhibited works that would inform his later, landmark work, Floor Event (1970), as well as his wood paintings. These works took three forms, all of which drew attention to the relationship between painting and its environment. The first form of artistic gesture of this exhibition was to stretch the wooden stretcher bars with transparent plastic vinyl so that the wall beneath remained visible when hung. In a second gesture, Hikosaka made a wooden “wall” for the painting by placing a panel of wood beneath the plastic vinyl. For the third gesture, Hikosaka allowed the plastic vinyl to fall to the ground while the piece of wood remained on the wall. While the school was barricaded during the exhibitions, many people were still able to see it such as Haruo Fukuzumi, then editor of Bijutsu Techō, and Tama Art University teachers Yoshishige Saito, Yoshiaki Tono, and Yusuke Nakahara.

== Bikyōtō ==
In July 1969 Bikyōtō, short for Bijutsu Kyoto Kaigi (Artists Joint-Struggle Committee), was founded around Hikosaka and his fellow Tama Art University friend, Hori Kosai. Other members included Miyako Ishiuchi and Ryuji Miyamoto. As a part of Bikyōtō, Hikosaka also became acquainted with photographers associated with the photography magazine Provoke when the two groups shared desk space at Provoke member Koji Taki's design office. Other acquaintances at this time included as Daido Moriyama and Takuma Nakahira.

However, Bikyōtō suffered disorganization and disbandment in 1970 when the university administration cracked down on the student protestors and when the Anpo treaty was extended. Hikosaka became the chief theorist of Bikyōtō and proposed the group become revived as the “Bikyōtō Revolution Committee.” The initial five artists of this committee were Hikosaka, Hori, Nobuo Yamanaka, Yasunao Tone, and Tajima Renji (influenced by emergent Feminist discourses, Miyako Ishiuchi went in her own direction). As part of the reformation of the group, Hikosaka theorized a “strategic retreat” away from the overtly political and into the domain of art. Part of this endeavor was to be the first act of the new Bikyōtō Revolution Committee, which organized a series of solo exhibitions outside of galleries or museums in 1970. An important political implication of this “strategic retreat” was the critical reckoning of art as an “internal institution” (uchinaru seido) itself. Therefore, Hikosaka did not conceive of this project as institutional critique in the conventional art historical sense of institutional spaces, but rather proposed to critique the “internal institution” located within the viewer.

== Floor Event (1970) ==
It was within this context of the “Bikyōtō Revolution Committee” that Hikosaka created his landmark work, Floor Event in 1970. Addressing the internal institution of art beyond the gallery or museum, Hikosaka decided to stage his solo exhibition in his room. Equipped with cans of latex (on which he had spent about 200,000 yen), Hikosaka undressed and proceeded to pour the material to the floor from a bucket and used a hand broom to spread it on the floor. Tone and Hikosaka's artist friend Mikio Koyanagi assisted him in the production of the work, with Tone pressing the shutter of a 35mm camera Hikosaka set up to document the process.

Initially, Hikosaka had planned to use plaster, a traditional art material, for this work in order turn the floor of his room white. Hikosaka cites the depression that followed the failure of the first Bikyōtō as artistic inspiration for turning his room white (a color symbolic of death in Japanese culture). However, at the advice of his friend and mentor, Fluxus affiliated musician Yasunao Tone, he decided to use latex instead. Tone's influence on the work also extends further back to the summer of 1969 when Hikosaka joined his Edmund Husserl reading group. Hikosaka's interest in Husserl's phenomenology can be seen in his use of artistic devices to frame aspects of ordinary life, what phenomenology scholars call his “phenomenological bracketing.” We may observe such phenomenological bracketing in Hikosaka's use of latex to call attention to the floor, which gradually transformed from an opaque, white coating to a transparent skin as it dried over the course of nine days.

Hikosaka's gesture not only had the effect of dissimulation of how we experience the physical ground within ordinary life, it was also a metaphorical gesture that pointed to the way we experience the naturalized epistemological “ground” on which the discourse of art “stands”. Within this gesture, which demands reconsideration of both spatial phenomenology and the theoretical tenets of an artwork simultaneously, the imperative to address the “internal institution” that is at once perceptual and ideological becomes apparent. This effect is accentuated by the photographic documentation which is integral to the work itself. Depicting both the act of making and subsequent reflection upon creation by Hikosaka, the photographs enable the viewer to share the artist's contemplative and phenomenological discovery that unfolds over time. Because the drying slowly renders the latex invisible to the camera, it is only in the relation between discrete exposures that the work is photographically conveyed.

The work was positively reviewed by Jiro Takamatsu in the July 1971 issue of Bijutsu Techō.

== Art criticism ==
From around 1970 onward Hikosaka also began to publish art criticism. He is perhaps most known in this regard for his “Critiquing Lee Ufan—Fascism based on the internal crisis of ‘expression’,” published in Dezain Hihyō (Design Review) in November of 1970, where he accused Lee of “apolitical mysticism that suppressed human agency amid the crisis of expression in the late 1960s.” Elsewhere Hikosaka has critiqued the material approach of Mono-ha, arguing that it cannot account for differences in information. He argues this by presenting the example of two DVDs, one containing a movie and another which is empty, but which seem to be materially identical. He notes, however, that his famous attack on Lee was not a personal one and that he drank and exhibited with Lee many times. Instead, the critique was one of a general fascism of the time that he saw manifested in Lee's practice.

His writing on Gutai, a well-known group from the Kansai area, was among the earliest critical texts on them in Japan. In “Beyond the Closed Circle: What Can We Learn From Gutai's Trajectory?” (initially published August, 1973 in Bijutsu Techo), Hikosaka analyzes the practice of Kazuo Shiraga to critque Gutai's emphasis on the activity of art making over “poesis.” Turing to the Mono-ha practice of Nobuo Sekine's, he goes on to claim that Sekine turns Gutai's emphasis on activity itself into poesis by turning the means to “encounter an open world” into the artwork's goal. Hikosaka ends the article by contemplating the works of Group “I”, which for him demonstrate a stronger sense of “praxis” than both Shiraga and Sekine. He defines praxis as where “the activity itself is the purpose” and is one “based on ‘living together’—that is, on human relations.”

Here we also gain in this article an insight into Hikosaka's praxis-oriented approach and the influence of Gutai's instruction to “never copy others” on arriving at this conviction. Hikosaka writes, “I was driven crazy by this instruction, which led me into a trap of my own making, in which I believed that there was ‘nothing more I could do.’ But this process of getting caught in my own trap still possessed a phase of ‘art.’ Although I shall not mention the process in detail here, it did allow me, by means of practice arising from the art phase, to glimpse the depth of the domain of nonartwork.” He goes on to write of his “attitude of adhering to nonproductive acts and the depth of the domain of nonartwork.” This attitude appears in Bikyōtō Revolution Committee's vow as a collectivist endeavor to abstain from art making for one year, declared the month following the publication of “Beyond the Closed Circle.”

From 1972 to 1977 Hikosaka edited two journals related to Bikyōtō: Kirokutai: Art & Document and Bijutsu shihyō, in which much of Bikyōtō associated critical texts appeared. 1972 also saw the publication of “Chronology: 50 years of contemporary art, 1916-1968” in Bijutsu Techō, a survey of Japanese contemporary art during that time frame authored primarily by Hikosaka and Tone. More recently he has used blogging, social media platforms and mailing lists to disseminate his writing as a way of questioning what art is during the age of information.

== Continuation of collectivist art ==
Another outcome of Tone and Hikosaka's Husserl reading group was the Group of Five's Photobook Revolution Editorial Committee in 1971, consisting of Hikosaka, Hisashi Ito, Shoichi Ikeda, Naoichi Yano and Kanji Suzuki. This transdisciplinary group of painters, designers and one photographer deconstructed the medium of photography while simultaneously interrogating the space between individual and collective expression. Their collective endeavors manifested as exhibitions, prints, and photo books, including Group of Five's Silkscreen Revolution: A Book (1972), a one-of-a-kind photo book measuring 90 x 90cm. This book contained a series of chapters which deconstructed the silkscreen process. The first chapter began with “cognition” (the subject), featuring photographic self-portraits of each member. The second focused on “the cognized” (the object), and featured a landscape photo taken by each of the members. In the third chapter, “the cognized” is “destructed” in high-contrasts lithographic prints of the prior landscape photographs. The fourth chapter presents another destruction using the lithographic film used for the previous chapter. The fifth chapter shows yet another destruction as five silkscreens. The sixth and final chapter “revealed the resulting silkscreen prints, the end product of the successive ‘destructions.’”

In 1972 Hikosaka also collaborated with his first wife, Masako Shibata on SEA FOR FLOOR, SEA FOR WALL, and SEA FOR ROOF. For SEA FOR FLOOR, two open reel tape decks simultaneously played a tape recording of the sea that was looped around interior and exterior space of Kuni Chiya Buyo Kenkyujo (Kuni Chiya Dance Laboratory) in the kindergarten in front of the University of Tokyo. SEA FOR ROOF was a similar arrangement but with the tape decks and operators on the roof. SEA FOR WALL was a photographic print displayed on a wall outside. A similar use of media was used in Hikosaka's Film Duet: Upright Sea (1972/2015) in which two 16mm film projectors face opposite directions from across the gallery space, both projecting footage of the sea from a single film reel that loops from one projector to the other as it advances through the air and along the floor. This piece, which was shown at “ 5th Exhibition of Contemporary Plastic Art: Expression in Film ’72—Thing. Place. Time. Space: Equivalent Cinema” at the Kyoto Municipal Museum of Art, was reconstructed in 2015 on the occasion of “Re: play 1972/2015 – Restaging “Expression in Film 1972” curated by Kenjin Miwa at the National Museum of Modern Art in Tokyo.

From 1982 to 1983 he attended University of Pennsylvania Graduate School of Fine Arts, under the auspices of the Japanese Government Department of Culture foreign art study program.

In September 1973 the Bikyōtō Revolution Committee further turned the Husserlian bracket inward by vowing not to make any art for the following year of 1974. This was announced at “Printing Machine,” a group exhibition of six Bikyoto artists at the Tamamura Gallery in Tokyo. The statement reads, “[These] six have founded the second Bikyōtō Revolution Committee and agreed that during the coming year of 1974 they will perform no activity related to the production and exhibition of works. Based on this agreement, the present exhibition is organized and the works shown here are produced.” During this period, Hikosaka stayed at the Zen Buddhist temple Rinsho-ji in Gunma prefecture, the childhood home of his then-wife Masako Shibata.

== Practice by Wood Painting ==
In 1977 Hikosaka would begin his next sustained project of “reconstructing” painting. To do so Hikosaka had first to deconstruct the medium conventions in order to create a new point of departure for painting. He arrived at the use of wood, a material that references the history of Japanese art, also citing that the history of oil painting on panel precedes that on stretched canvas. These paintings also reject flatness, a central tenet of Greenbergian formalism and therefore Western Avant-Garde discourse, producing painted surfaces that exist in relief instead. The material of wood also is of personal significance to Hikosaka, who recounts staring at the wood grain of the ceiling during his early experiences of tuberculosis-related hospitalization. According to Alexandra Munroe, “Hikosaka's choice to construct paintings on wood that involved craft, design and color challenged what some critics saw as Mono-ha's excessive anti-formalism and mystical whimsy” and was “a sincere attempt to forge a regenerative, not destructive, post-avant-garde art.”

Hikosaka was featured in the Queens Museum's landmark 1999 exhibition, “Global Conceptualism: Points of Origin 1950s-1980s” along with Yutaka Matsuzawa, Yoko Ono, Genpei Akasegawa, Yasunao Tone, Hori Kosai and Nomura Hitoshi. He participated in the 2003 and 2009 Echigo-Tsumari Art Triennale where he exhibited A Tale of 42 Houses (2003) and Floor Event 2009 (2009), respectively. From 2009 to 2013 he was specially-appointed professorship at Rikkyo University Graduate School. His work in included is the National Museum of Modern Art (Tokyo), the Getty Research Institute (Los Angeles), Queensland Art Gallery (Queensland, Australia), The Museum of Fine Arts (Houston), the National Museum of Art (Osaka), the Hiroshima City Museum of Contemporary Art (Hiroshima), and many other public collections.

== Exhibitions ==
=== Selected solo exhibitions ===
1970 “Floor Event No.1”, Hikosaka's own residence, Tokyo

1972 “Floor Event No.3 / Delivery Event”, Gallery 16, Kyoto

“Upright Sea”, Kyoto Shoin Hall, Kyoto

1975 “Practice by 51 Sounds”, Muramatsu Gallery, Tokyo

1977 “Practice by Shiritsu”, Muramatsu Gallery, Tokyo

“Practice by Wood Painting”, Shintamura Gallery, Tokyo

1981 “Practice by Wood Painting”, TOKYO GALLERY + Muramatsu Gallery, Tokyo

1988 “Naoyoshi Hikosaka 1975-1988”, Gallery Te, Tokyo

1990 “Naoyoshi Hikosaka 1990 ASIA”, TOKYO GALLERY + Gallery Te, Tokyo

1992 “Cut-out Sculpture and New Upright Sea”, TOKYO GALLERY + SOKO TOKYO GALLERY, Tokyo

1993 “New Floor Event”, Muramatsu Gallery, Tokyo

1996 TOKYO GALLERY, Tokyo

2000 “New Wood Painting + α”, TOKYO GALLERY, Tokyo

2001 “Origin of Naoyoshi Hikosaka”, Gallery Te, Tokyo

2002 Lee Ufan · Naoyoshi Hikosaka in Two Person Exhibition, TOKYO GALLERY, Tokyo

2007 “INTERSECTION – Three Events of NaoyoshiI Hikosaka Kyoto 1972 -”, Gallery 16, Kyoto

“VERTICAL CIRCLE: Retrospective exhibition of Naoyoshi Hikosaka”, The Softmachine Museum of Art, Kagawa

2010 “HISTORY LESSONS / The Imaginary Museum of the Imperial Palace”, MAKII MASARU FINE ARTS, Tokyo

2014 “an exhibition for no audience”, Avant-garde experimental NETART, Kanagawa

2016 “FLOOR EVENT 1970”, MISA SHIN GALLERY, Tokyo

2020 “Floor Event: Repetitions and Variations”, MISA SHIN GALLERY, Tokyo

=== Selected group exhibitions ===
1969 “Plastic Artists League Exhibition”, inside barricaded Tama University campus, TokyoRe

1975 “The 7th Paris Youth Biennale”, Musée d’Art Moderne de la Ville de Paris, Paris, Paris

1982 “The 40th Venice Viennale”, Venice

1987 “19a Bienal Internacional de Artes de São Paulo”, São Paulo

1988 “Olympiad of Art”, National Museum of Contemporary Art, Korea, Seoul

1989 “Europalia 1989 Japan in Belgium”, Museum voor Schone Kunsten Gent, Gent

1999 “Global Conceptualism: Points of Origin, 1950s-1980s”, The Queens Museum of Art, New York

2000–09 “The 1st-4th Echigo-Tsumari Art Triennial”, Niigata

2001 “CENTURY CITY”, Tate Modern, London

2005 “Ljubljana International Biennial of Graphic Art”, Ljubljana moderna galerija, Ljubljana

2007 “The 1st Lisbon Architecture Triennale”, Lisbon

2008 “Kompira Art 2008 Toramaru Shachu”, Auditorium Kotohira-cho, Kagawa

2013 “The 1st, 3rd, 5th, 7th, 9th Reverse triangular relationship Exhibition”, The Bamboo culture space, Tokyo

“Concert: Naoyoshi Hikosaka + Noise Music Concert of A.A.C.L”, Kissa Sakaiki, Tokyo

“Re:play 1972/2015 Restaging ”, The National Museum of Modern Art Tokyo, Tokyo

2016 “The 11th, 13th, 15th, 16th, 18th, 20th, 22nd, 24th, 28th, 30th Reverse triangular relationship Exhibition”, The Bamboo culture space,

Tokyo

2017 “The Disconnection-Art Movement: An Exhibition of Simulation-Art”, Tokyo Metropolitan Museum, Tokyo

2018 “Travelers: Stepping into the Unknown”, The National Museum of Art, Osaka

“TAKAHASHI COLLECTION Face and Abstraction”, Kiyoharu Art Colony, Yamanashi

2019 “Group Show 2”, MISA SHIN GALLERY, Tokyo

“Who opens up the world?”, Toyota Municipal Museum of Art, Aichi
