= Daidō Moriyama =

Japanese photographer

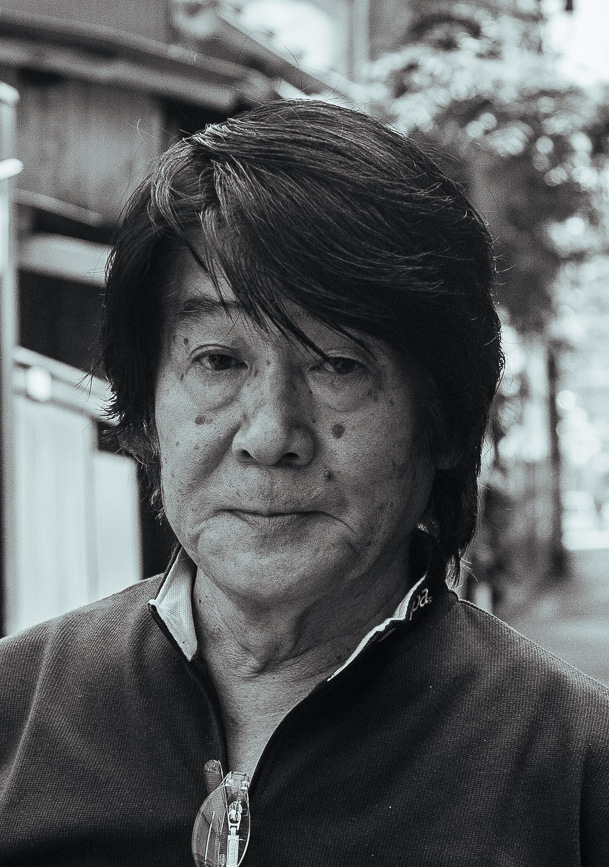
- Moriyama, Tokyo, 2010
- Born: Hiromichi Moriyama; October 10, 1938 (age 87); Ikeda, Osaka, Japan
- Known for: Photography
- Notable work: Japan: A Photo Theatre, Farewell Photography, Stray Dog, Tights

Daidō Moriyama (Japanese: 森山 大道, Hepburn: Moriyama Daidō; born October 10, 1938) is a Japanese photographer best known for his black-and-white street photography and association with the avant-garde photography magazine Provoke.

Moriyama began his career as an assistant to photographer Eikoh Hosoe, a co-founder of the avant-garde photo cooperative Vivo, and made his mark with his first photobook Japan: A Photo Theater, published in 1968. His formative work in the 1960s boldly captured the darker qualities of urban life in postwar Japan in rough, unfettered fashion, filtering the rawness of human experience through sharply tilted angles, grained textures, harsh contrast, and blurred movements through the photographer's wandering gaze. Many of his well-known works from the 1960s and 1970s are read through the lenses of post-war reconstruction and post-Occupation cultural upheaval.

Moriyama continued to experiment with the representative possibilities offered by the camera in his 1969 Accident series, which was serialized over one year in the photo magazine Asahi Camera, in which he deployed his camera as a copying machine to reproduce existing media images. His 1972 photobook Farewell Photography, which was accompanied by an interview with his fellow Provoke photographer Takuma Nakahira, presents his radical effort to dismantle the medium.

Although the photobook is a favored format of presentation among Japanese photographers, Moriyama was particularly prolific: he has produced more than 150 photobooks since 1968. His creative career has been honored by a number of solo exhibitions by major institutions, along with his two-person exhibition with William Klein at Tate Modern in 2012–13. He has received numerous accolades throughout his career, including the Hasselblad Award in 2019 and the International Center of Photography Infinity Award in 2012.

== Career ==
=== Early life and career beginnings ===
Moriyama was born in Ikeda, Osaka in 1938 as Hiromichi Moriyama. Owing to his father's work, his family moved frequently, and Moriyama spent parts of his childhood in Tokyo, Hiroshima, Chiba, and Shimane (his paternal family's home prefecture) before returning to Osaka around the age of 11.

From the ages of 16 to 20, he worked in graphic design before pivoting to photography in his early 20s after purchasing an inexpensive Canon IV Sb from a friend. In Osaka, Moriyama worked at the studio of photographer Takeji Iwamiya before moving to Tokyo in 1961 to connect with the radical photography collective Vivo, whose work he admired. He eventually found work as an assistant to photographer and Vivo member Eikoh Hosoe, whom he credits with teaching him much of the fundamentals of photographic practice and technique. Yet for the three years he spent working for Hosoe, Moriyama did not take any photographs of his own until Hosoe, out of impatience, urged him to show him some of his own work.

As a young man coming of age in 1950s and '60s, Moriyama bore witness to the political unrest (illustrated most vividly in the 1960 Anpo protests), economic revival and mass consumerism, and radical art-making that characterized the two decades following the end of World War II. His first photobook, Nippon gekijō shashinchō (にっぽん劇場写真帖, Japan: A Photo Theater), published in 1968, captures the excitement, tension, anxiety, and rage of urban life during this critical historical juncture through a collection of images, indiscriminate in subject matter, presented in dizzying succession through full-page spreads. The photographs range from ordinary streetscapes featuring blurred faces and garish signage to snapshots alluding to the aggressive redevelopment taking place in Tokyo and the rubble left in its wake, as well as images of nightlife and darker elements of urban life. As the title of the photobook suggests, Moriyama's approach homes in on the spectacle of everyday life in all its ugliness and splendor.

=== Provoke (1969–70) ===
In 1965, a series of photographs of preserved human embryos, titled Mugon geki ("silent theatre", Pantomime), by Moriyama were published in the magazine Gendai no me and caught the attention of avant-garde poet Shūji Terayama. Terayama commissioned Moriyama to provide accompanying images for his experimental theatre and prose works, providing Moriyama with a boost in his early career and connecting him to other avant-garde creatives including Tadanori Yokoo and Takuma Nakahira. His connection to Nakahira, a founding member of the photography magazine Provoke, eventually led to his participation in the publication beginning with the second issue in 1969.

Moriyama is widely recognized for his work associated with the short-lived but deeply influential magazine, which was founded by photographers Takuma Nakahira and Yutaka Takanishi, along with critic Kōji Taki and writer Takahiko Okada in 1968. The publication popularized the "are, bure, boke" style, translated as "grainy/rough, blurry, out-of-focus," an aesthetic rebuttal to the dominant European-style photojournalism style (exemplified by Ken Domon's realist approach) and straightforward commercial work that dominated the Japanese photography scene at the time. These visions of everyday life rejected the notion that photography captures a lucid reflection of the world undergirded by a legible ideological argument; rather, they sought to emphasize the fragmentary nature of reality and make evident the photographer's prowling, wandering gaze.

Eroticism and masculinized subjectivity are often associated with Moriyama's contributions to the magazine, as evidenced by works such as "Eros" (1969), featured in the second issue of the publication. The grainy, skewed image features a nude woman smoking a cigarette on a hotel bed—suggestive of the aftermath of a tryst. Her back faces the viewer, while her surroundings are shrouded in dense shadows, giving the camera's gaze a furtive and ominous air.

As stated in the magazine's 1968 manifesto, "[T]he images [eizō] themselves are not ideas. They do not possess the wholeness of concepts, neither are they a communicative code like language....But this irreversible materiality [hikagyakuteki bussitsusei] – reality cut off from the camera – constitutes the reverse side of the world defined by language; and for this reason, [the image] is at times able to provoke the world of language and ideas." Provoke sought to assert photography's role in producing a phenomenological encounter that focused on the bodily and the immediate, moving beyond preconceived notions of truth, reality, and vision to probe questions surrounding the identity of photographic matter and the roles of the photographer, subject, and viewer. Though the collective only produced three issues and a book, First, Abandon the World of Pseudocertainty – Thoughts on Photography and Language (1970), each member continued to publicize their work in close relation to the "era of Provoke," and the magazine has had an immense cultural impact and been the subject of numerous international exhibitions.

=== Akushidento (Accident) (1969) ===
In 1968, Moriyama began producing a series focused on the theme of "equivalence" using images featured in mass media as his source material. According to Moriyama, the series was prompted by an experience he had at a train terminal in Tokyo, whereupon he was shocked to see the news of Robert F. Kennedy's assassination on the front page of newspapers scattered all around him. Taking interest in the mediated nature of press images, Moriyama says in an interview with Nakahira that this encounter prompted him to become "determined to negate the values that are attached to one single photograph." Moriyama photographed images reproduced from different mass media, including a television still of Lyndon B. Johnson announcing the suspension of the bombing of North Vietnam, newswire shots of Richard Nixon shortly after winning the presidential election, and the corpses of brutally killed Vietcong soldiers, along with the aforementioned image of Robert F. Kennedy. Moriyama treated the camera as a device that copies reality and thus produces "equivalents," rendering insignificant the distance that the original photographs, the endlessly reproduced press images, and Moriyama's own versions have from the initial event. The twelve-part series was published in Asahi Camera alongside his own texts, where he describes the unpredictability of fate and the precariousness of human experience, believing that the camera has the capacity to reveal the "possibility of tragedy [that] has somehow seeped into the surrounding environment."

=== Shashin yo sayōnara (Farewell Photography) (1972) ===
Published in April 1972, Shashin yo sayōnara ("Farewell Photography") emerged within the context of Japan's aggressive cultural and economic revival—best exemplified in the creative sphere by Expo '70—and continued suppression of left-wing politics, as illustrated by the failure of the 1970 Anpo protests and the subsequent renewal of the United States-Japan Security Treaty. The photobook, as suggested by the title, takes a nihilistic turn from his prior work, turning its attention towards the incidental and evocative nature of photography rather than the visual subject itself. The images highlight the physical detritus of the photographic process, such as the edges of discarded film, flecks of dust, and light leaks, along with the material dimensions of image-making as evidenced through the sprocket holes on negative strips and the brand names of the film, challenging the indexical relationship between photographer, camera, and image and the established conventions of viewing photographs as referents of reality.

=== Karyūdo (A Hunter) (1972) ===
Inspired by the liberatory and indeterminate qualities of Sal Paradise's journey in Jack Kerouac's On the Road (1957, first Japanese translation published in 1959), Moriyama borrowed a friend's old Toyota and embarked on a solo road trip across Japan, capturing photographs along the trip that would become the basis for Karyūdo ("A Hunter"), a photobook published in June 1972 as the tenth installment of the series Gendai no me ("The Modern Gaze"). Many of the scenes were captured by Moriyama as he drove past them, made evident by the skewed angles, blurry, moving figures, and fragments of road infrastructure that cut across the picture plane. The title of the volume refers to his "stalker-life" attitude towards observing and capturing his surroundings, through the perspective of a cold, detached, solitary watcher. At the same time, the volume maintains a certain open-endedness in its format, lacking any sort of narrative resolution that might typically accompany the trope of a road trip or a hunting excursion, and instead putting forth a sensation of perpetual anxiety and uncertainty through its succession of consistently detached and irresolvable images of subjects and scenes across Japan.

The book contains some of Moriyama's best-known images, including "Stray Dog, Misawa, 1971", which depicts a growling, haggard dog turning its head towards the camera. The image was taken in Misawa, Aomori prefecture, where a large US Air Force base is located (Moriyama shot at other U.S. military bases throughout his career, including at the naval base in Yokosuka.) The introduction of the book was written by pop artist and graphic designer Tadanori Yokoo, who wrote of Moriyama's pictures as being akin to "someone who talks, without looking people in the eye." The book was re-released in 2011 with the addition of new commentary by Moriyama.

=== Later work ===
In 1974 Moriyama helped Shōmei Tōmatsu to establish the Workshop Photography School to teach their new understanding of photography to students. Nobuyoshi Araki, Eikoh Hosoe, Masahisa Fukase were also involved. They published a magazine, the Workshop Quarterly, that reached eight issues. When the engagement broke up two years later, Moriyama and his students founded Image Shop Camp, the first gallery in Japan dedicated exclusively to photography. In the eight years of their existence the around 30 members had organized 200 exhibitions, and "gave rise to some of the most explosive happenings in the history of post-war Japanese photography."

In 1974 the National Museum of Modern Art in Tokyo organized the photography exhibition Fifteen Photographers Today, curated by Tsutomu Watanabe, who had selected Moriyama, Araki and Fukase alongside Shoko Hashimoto, Kazuo Kitai, Masatoshi Naito, Takuma Nakahira, Takao Nikura, Hajime Sawatari, Kishin Shinoyama, Yutaka Takanashi, Shigeru Tamura, Katsumi Watanabe, Shuji Yamada, and Shin Yanagisawa.

Moriyama's work, though intimately engaged with the intricacies of social life and the image-laden nature of modern society, did not aspire to the same tendencies of social reportage exhibited by his contemporaries during the 1970s. Instead, his approach takes into account the futility of the medium in reproducing the reality of his surroundings, the inherently fragmentary nature of the world, and the indelible presence of the photographer in all images, lurking or haunting the sphere of his subjects.

He has continued to shoot artistic as well as commercial work over the decades both in and outside of Japan, and is one of the most active and prolific contemporary photographers in Japan. In 2024, he photographed American rapper Kanye West's cover for his studio album Bully (2026).

== Style and technique ==
=== Influences ===
Influences cited by Moriyama include Seiryū Inoue, Eikoh Hosoe, Shōmei Tōmatsu, William Klein, Andy Warhol, Yukio Mishima, and Shūji Terayama.

The Shinjuku area is frequent setting for Moriyama's images of urban life. The photographer cites Shinjuku's shadowy, labyrinthine streets and alleys as a source of inspiration and allure, describing the area as having "a strange narcotic effect...something about it that traps me and puts me under a spell."

=== Format ===
Moriyama predominantly presents his work in the form of photobooks (and self-published photo magazines), which he describes as open-ended sites, allowing the reader to decide on the sequence of images that they view. Since 1968, he has published more than 150 photobooks. The photobook arose as a popular format in the 1950s and 60s, and were often produced at a small scale and disseminated through bookstores and localized political networks rather than being mass-produced by major publishing houses.

Since the 2000s he has a preference for having a third party work on the formatting and recomposition of the images, as it frees him from the influences of his own memory and filters the images through the eye of an outsider. A collection of Moriyama's writings, compiled from a fifteen-part series published in Asahi Camera beginning in 1983, have been published as an autobiographical photobook titled Inu no kioku ("Memories of a Dog").

Moriyama's photographs are often captured in a 4:5 aspect ratio rather than the 3:2 ratio associated with the 35 mm format, and he has at times cropped his 35 mm photographs in order to achieve his preferred vertical format.

=== Technique ===
Moriyama tends to capture images without looking through the viewfinder, so as to separate himself from the detached, scientific, and deliberate cropping produced by the viewfinder lens. He often takes a large volume of photographs of the world as it passes by him, embracing the uncertainty and indeterminacy of encountering the scenes as they reveal themselves during the development process. Many of his works are also analogue composites, with many layered film frames used to create a single print.

=== Color and digital work ===
While Moriyama is most recognized for his black-and-white film photography, he has been shooting with color since the 1970s, and since the late 2000s has turned increasingly to compact digital photography, now working almost exclusively in this medium. From time to time, he has also shot Polaroid images, which he treats as "tiles" in installation settings, exhibiting them in groups rather than as discrete photographs.

In 1970, he helped produce the Asahi Journal's new color photography series Dai go shōgen ("The Fifth Quadrant") and published photo essays on new development projects in Osaka and Tokyo, cherry blossoms in Osaka, and American military base towns in the Kantō region. These projects employed his unconventional framing styles along with white balance and color exposure distortions that enhanced the uncanny, unsettling features of the world around him.

Due to his tendency to take a large number of shots when photographing, Moriyama finds the digital format more amenable to his needs, and rejects critics who fixate on the preciousness of film photography. In response to a question posted by writer Takeshi Nakamoto's regarding Moriyama's advice for beginner street photographers, Moriyama states, "Get outside. It’s all about getting out and walking. That’s the first thing. The second thing is, forget everything you’ve learned on the subject of photography for the moment, and just shoot. Take photographs—of anything and everything, whatever catches your eye. Don’t pause to think."

Daido Tokyo at Fondation Cartier pour l’art Contemporain, Paris in 2016 was the first major solo show to display his color photographs. Between 2008 and 2015, Moriyama revisited Tokyo, with a focus on the Shinjuku district—where much of his early career was spent—to take 86 chromogenic prints ("Tokyo Colour" series, 2008–2015) and black-and-white photographs ("Dog and Mesh Tights," 2014–2015).

== Exhibitions ==
Moriyama's work has been not often but consistently featured in group and solo exhibitions in Japan since the mid-1970s, usually about two solo shows per year with his first in 1970 titled Scandal. With the series called Pantomime he had his debut in 1968 together with Shin Yanagisawa at Ginza Nikon Salon in Tokyo where he was exhibited again several times over the following years, while he showed his work at the Image Shop Camp, too. In 1974 the Printing Show took place at Shimuzu Gallery in Tokyo. Instead of photographs on the walls Moriyama printed a series of his photographs on a photocopy machine, shuffled them and then were staple-bound with silkscreened cover (visitors could choose between two), resulting in the photobook titled Another Country. (The event was restaged in 2011 at Aperture Gallery in New York and the following year at the Tate Modern in London.)

Moriyama rose to prominence in the States after being heavily featured in the landmark group exhibition New Japanese Photography at the Museum of Modern Art in 1974, curated by John Szarkowski and Shoji Yamagishi. Selected as one of thirteen photographers in the show, Moriyama brought a grittier edge that emphasized the rawness of visual encounter, as well as a youthful perspective to the collection of artists, which included older practitioners such as Ken Domon and Shigeru Tamura, avant-garde contemporaries (and mentors to Moriyama) such as Shomei Tomatsu and Eikoh Hosoe, as well as those working in more polished, intellectualized, and observational approaches such as Ken Ohara, Ryoji Akiyama, and Bishin Jumonji.

In terms of solo exhibitions he was not recognized elsewhere until the mid-1990s; only a single show took place outside Japan, namely in Austrian Graz in 1980 (after a group show of contemporary Japanese photography in 1977). Since then the interest has accelerated and led to a number of major retrospectives. Beginning with the seminal 1999 retrospective exhibition Daido Moriyama: Stray Dog at San Francisco Museum of Modern Art curated by Sandra S. Phillips, that subsequently travelled to New York, Cambridge, and San Diego, as well as Switzerland and Germany. It was followed in 2003 by a retrospective that travelled through Japan and a first exhibition at the Fondation Cartier pour l'art contemporain in Paris, where a follow-up was organized in 2016 (Daido Tokyo), for which he was commissioned to create an "immersive" multiscreen projection of black-and-white photographs (Dog and Mesh Tights). Another major show travelled in 2007 from Cologne, Germany, to Seville, Spain and finally to the Tokyo Metropolitan Museum of Photography. 2012 saw two institutional exhibitions at the Los Angeles County Museum of Art, and the Tate Modern (with William Klein).

== Awards ==
- 1967: New Artist Award from the Japan Photo Critics Association
- 1983: Annual Award from the Photographic Society of Japan
- 2003: The 44th Mainichi Art Award
- 2004: The Cultural Award from the German Society for Photography (DGPh)
- 2004: Lifetime Achievement Award from The Photographic Society of Japan
- 2012: Infinity Award, Lifetime Achievement category, International Center of Photography (ICP), New York
- 2018: French Ordre des Arts et des Lettres, Chevalier
- 2019: Hasselblad Foundation International Award in Photography, Gothenburg, Sweden
- 2020: Asahi Prize

== Solo exhibitions ==
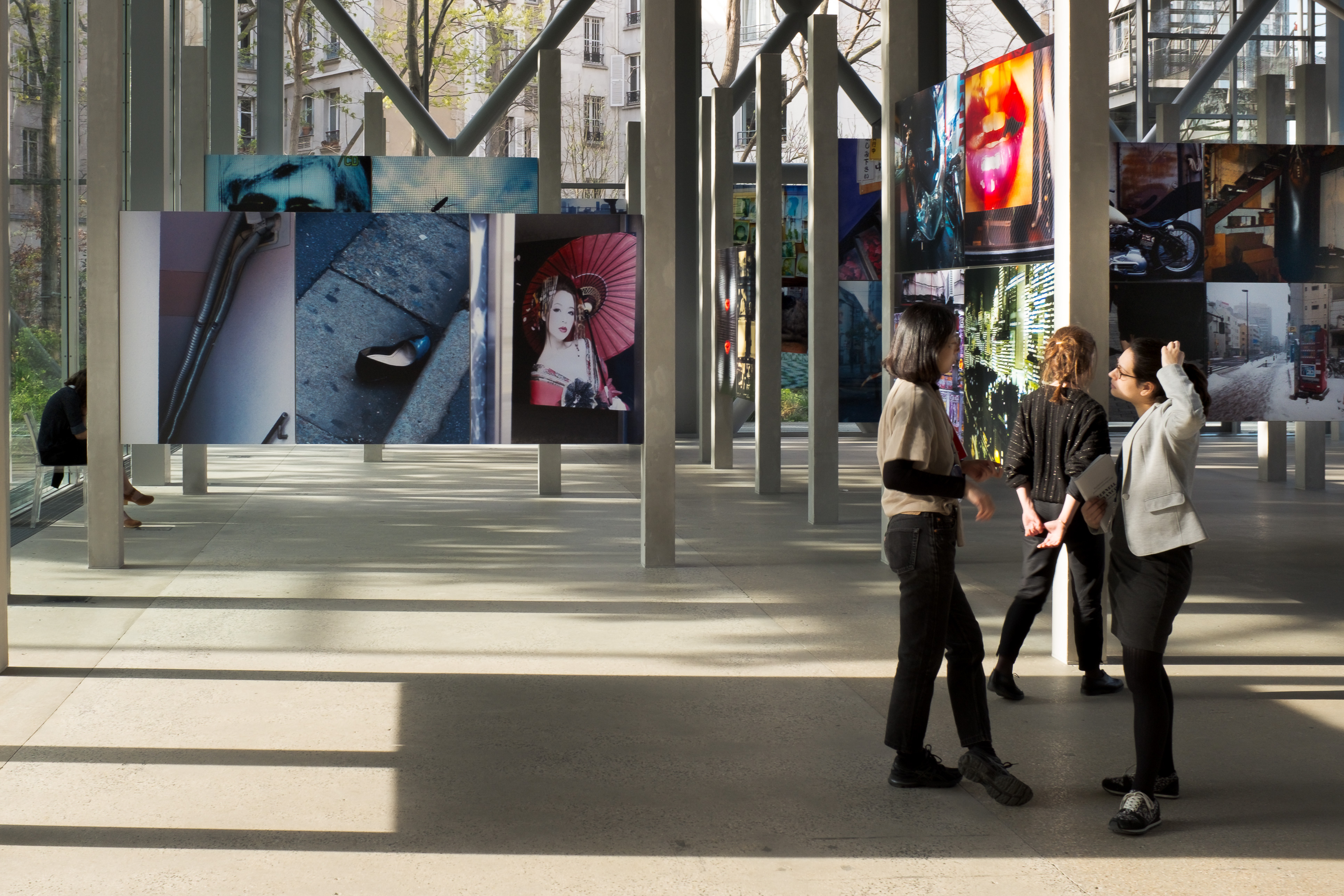
2016 Exhibition Daido Tokyo at Fondation Cartier in Paris.

- 1993 – Moriyama Daido Photo Exhibition, Laurence Miller Gallery, New York City
- 1999 – Daido Moriyama: Stray Dog, San Francisco Museum of Modern Art, San Francisco
  - Metropolitan Museum of Art (Met), Japan Society Gallery, New York City
  - Fotomuseum Winterthur, Switzerland
  - Museum Folkwang, Essen, Germany
  - Harvard Art Museums, Cambridge, MA
  - Museum of Photographic Arts, San Diego, CA
  - and "several museum venues in Japan"
- 2002 – Daido Moriyama: Shinjuku – Platform – Light & Shadow, The Museum of Contemporary Art, Nagoya, Japan
- 2002 – inside the white cube: Antipodes, White Cube, London
- 2003 – Moriyama Daido 1965–2003, Shimane Art Museum, Shimane, Japan; travelling to
  - Kushiro Art Museum, Hokkaido, Japan
  - Kawasaki City Museum, Kawasaki, Japan
- 2003 – Fondation Cartier pour l'art contemporain, Paris
- 2004 – Remix, Galerie Kamel Mennour, Paris
- 2005 – Daido Moriyama, Gallery Raku (Kyoto University of Art and Design), Kyoto, Japan
- 2005 – Buenos Aires, Gallery D's (Kyoto University of Art and Design), Kyoto, Japan
- 2006 – Daido Moriyama, Foam Fotografiemuseum Amsterdam, The Netherlands
- 2007 – Daido Moriyama: Retrospective Since 1965, Die Photographische Sammlung/SK Stiftung Kultur, Cologne, Germany; in cooperation with and travelling to
  - Centro Andaluz de Arte Contemporáneo (CAAC) at Monastery of Santa Maria de las Cuevas, Seville, Spain
  - 2008 – plus Daido Hawaii, Tokyo Metropolitan Museum of Photography, Tokyo
- 2011 – On the Road, National Museum of Art, Osaka, Japan
- 2012 – Fracture: Daido Moriyama, Los Angeles County Museum of Art
- 2012/13 – William Klein + Daido Moriyama, Tate Modern, London
- 2016 – Daido Tokyo, Fondation Cartier pour l'art contemporain, Paris, France
- 2016 – Shangri-La, Hyogo Prefectural Museum of Art
- 2019 – A Diary, Hasselblad Foundation, Gothenburg, Sweden
- 2020 – Silkscreen, Taka Ishii Gallery, Tokyo
- 2021 – Moriyama – Tomatsu; Tokyo, Maison européenne de la photographie, Paris
- 2023 – Daido Moriyama: Retrospective, Instituto Moreira Salles, São Paulo, curated by Thyago Nogueira
  - C/O Berlin, Germany

== Publications ==
=== Photobooks ===
- Nippon Gekijo Shashincho (= Japan: A Photo Theater). Muromachi Shob, 1968. 216 pages, with text in two places by Shūji Terayama (Japanese).
  - Revised edition: Shinchosha; Photo Musée, 1995. ISBN 978-4-10-602418-4 (Japanese).
  - New edition: Bookshop M/Getsuyosha 2018. Signed edition of 700 copies (Japanese/English).
- Karyudo = A Hunter. For Jack Kerouac. Tokyo: Chuo-koron-sha, 1972. Text by Yokoo Tadanori (Japanese/English).
  - Reprint: Tokyo: Taka Ishii Gallery, 1997.
- Sashin yo Sayonara (= Bye Bye Photography). Tokyo: Shashin hyoron-sha, 1972.
  - Reprint included in:The Japanese Box. Facsimiles of six publications of the Provoke era, edited by Christoph Schifferli. Concept and design by Gerhard Steidl and Karl Lagerfeld. Paris: Edition 7L, und Göttingen: Steidl, 2001. ISBN 3-88243-301-9. Edition of 1500 sets.
  - Reissued as Farewell Photography. Tokyo: PowerShovel, 2006.
  - Farewell Photography. Bookshop M/Getsuyosha, 2019.
- Kagerou (= Mayfly) Tokyo: Haga, 1972.
- Documentary = Kiroku = Record, No. 1–5. Privately published, 1972–73.
  - Record No. 1–5. Complete Reprint Edition. Tokyo: Akio Nagasawa, 2008. ISBN 978-1-59005-273-0.
- Another Country. Privately published, 1974.
- Tales of Tono. Asahi Sonorama, 1976.
  - Japan: Kobunsha, 2007.
  - London: Tate, 2012.
- Japan, a Photo Theater II. Asahi Sonorama, 1978. Essay by Shoji Yamagishi (Japanese).
- Hikari to Kage = Light and Shadow. Tojūsha, 1982.
  - Light and Shadow. Kodansha, 2009.
- A Journey to Nakaji. Tokyo: Sokyūsha, 1987.
- Moriyama Daidō 1970–1979. Tokyo: Sokyūsha, 1989.
- Lettre a St. Lou. Kawade Shobo Shinsha, 1990.
- Daido hysteric No. 4. Hysteric Glamour, 1993.
- Color. Tokyo: Sokyūsha, 1993.
- Daido hysteric No. 6. Text by Osamu Wataya. Hysteric Glamour, 1994 (Japanese/English). Ed. of 600 copies.
- A Dog's Time. Sakuhinsha, 1995.
- Imitation. Tokyo: Taka Ishii Gallery, 1995. Edition of 500 copies.
- Daido hysteric Osaka No. 8. Hysteric Glamour, 1997.
- Fragments. Tokyo: Composite, 1998.
- Passage. Wides, 1999.
- Dream of water. Tokyo: Sokyūsha, 1999.
- Visions of Japan: Daido Moriyama. Tokyo: Korinsha, 1999.
- Color 2. Tokyo: Sokyūsha, 1999.
- Kako wa itsumo atarashiku, mirai wa tsune ni natsukashii ("The past is always new, the future is always nostalgic"). Seikyūsha, 2000. ISBN 4-7872-7126-1.
- Platform. Tokyo: Taka Ishii Gallery, and Daiwa Radiator Company, 2002.
- '71 – NY Daido Moriyama. PPP, 2002.
- Shinjuku. Tucson, AZ: Nazraeli, and Tokyo: Getsuyosha, 2002. Edition of 500 copies. ISBN 1-59005-038-X (English/Japanese).
- transit. Eyesencia, 2002.
- Daido Moriyama. Paris: Fondation Cartier pour l'art contemporain/Actes Sud, 2003.
- Daido Moriyama, The Complete Works. 4 individually signed volumes in slipcases with a signed C-print (of 20 different photographs). Daiwa Radiator Company, 2003–2004. Edition of 1000 copies. ISBNs: 4-9901842-1-1, 4-9901842-2-X, 4-9901842-3-8, 4-9901842-4-6.
- Remix. Paris: Galerie Kamel Mennour, 2004, ISBN 2-914171-17-X.
  - 2nd edition: 2012, ISBN 978-2-914171-49-6.
- Daido Moriyama. Guiding Light, 2004.
- Wilderness!. Parco, 2005.
- Shinjuku 19XX-20XX. Zurich: Hatje Cantz/Codax, 2005. ISBN 3-7757-1729-3 (English/German). Edited by Zdenek Felix.
- Tokyo. Reflex New Art Gallery, 2005.
- Buenos Aires. Kodansha, 2005.
- Lettre à St. Lou. Kawade Shobo Shinsha, 2005.
- Shinjuku Plus. Tokyo: Getsuyosha, 2006.
- t-82. PowerShovel, 2006.
- it. Rat Hole, 2006.
- Record No. 6 – Record No. 39. Tokyo: Akio Nagasawa, 2006–2018. Various individual editions, some including color.
- Snap. (Record, extra issue No. 1) Tokyo: Akio Nagasawa, 2007.
- Kagero & Colors. PowerShovel, 2007.
- Hawaii. Tokyo: Getsuyosha, 2007.
- Osaka Plus. Tokyo: Getsuyosha, 2007.
- Erotica. Asahi Shinbunsha, 2007.
- Witness #2: Daido Moriyama. Portland, OR: Nazraeli (Joy of Giving Something), 2007. Additional photographs by Emi Anrakuji, and Ken Kitano. ISBN 1-59005-199-8.
- Yashi. Tokyo: Taka Ishii Gallery, 2008. Text by 7. Edition of 500 copies.
  - Portland, OR: Nazraeli, 2009.
- Magazine Work, 2 vols. Tokyo: Getsuyosha, 2009.
  - 1965–1970.
  - 1971–1974.
- Tsugaru. Tokyo: Taka Ishii Gallery, 2010. ISBN 978-600-00-0694-5. Photographs taken in the Tsugaru-plain area of Aomori Prefecture in 1976. Edition of 1000 copies.
- MMM label (MMM = Moriyama, Satoshi Machiguchi and Hisako Motoo). Tokyo: Match and Company, 2010–2014. Editions of 1000 signed copies.
1. Auto-portrait. 2010. Text by Simon Baker.
2. Sunflower. 2011.
3. Whine and Vinegar. 2012.
4. Mirage. 2013.
5. Dazai. 2014. Text by Osamu Dazai ("Villon's Wife"). Edition of 1200 copies. ISBN 978-7-5502-5500-5.
- Gekijo. Tokyo: Super Labo, 2011. Edition of 500 copies.
- Paris 88/89. Paris/Arles, France: Poursuite, 2012 (2nd ed. 2013). ISBN 978-2-918960-68-3.
- Light & Shadow Magazine. "The Daido Factory at the 6. Fotobookfestival Kassel", Germany, 2013. Edition of 250 copies.
- Dog and Mesh Tights. Tokyo: Getsuyosha, 2015. Afterword by Moriyama (English/Japanese).
- Mantis. NZ Library Set 1. Portland, OR: Nazraeli, 2014. ISBN 978-1-59005-387-4. Edition of 350 copies with gelatine silver print.
- Self. One Picture Book 90. Portland, OR: Nazraeli, 2015. ISBN 978-1-59005-426-0. Edition of 500 copies.
- Fukei. Tokyo: Super Labo, 2015. Edition in two different covers, 350 each.
- Daido Moriyama in Color: Now, and Never Again. Milan: Skira, 2016. ISBN 978-88-572-2226-4.
  - 3 more volumes. Milan: Skira, 2018:
    - Yokosuka. ISBN 978-88-572-3116-7.
    - Nocturnal Nude. ISBN 978-88-572-3630-8.
    - Self-portrait. ISBN 978-88-572-3631-5.
- Osaka. Tokyo: Getsuyosha, 2016. Two different essays in Japanese and English.
- Terayama. Tokyo: Match and Company, 2016. Text by Shuji Terayama, afterword by Satoshi Machiguchi. ISBN 978-4-90811401-4 (Japanese) English edition available.
- Odasaku. Tokyo: Match and Company, 2016. With a short story by Sakunosuke Oda ("At the Horse Races"), afterword by Satoshi Machiguchi.
- Scandalous. Tokyo: Akio Nagasawa, 2016. Edition of 350 copies.
- Pantomime. Tokyo: Akio Nagasawa, 2017. Edition of 600 copies.
- Pretty Woman. Tokyo: Akio Nagasawa, 2017. Edition of 900 copies.
- K. Tokyo: Getsuyosha, 2017. ISBN 978-4-86503-050-1.
- Teppo yuri no Shateikyori. Tokyo: Getsuyosha, 2017. With haiku by Misa Uchida (Japanese).
- Aa, Koya. Kadokawa, 2017. With a story by Shūji Terayama.
- Uwajima. Switch, 2018. Photographs made in Uwajima, Ehime, in part previously published in Coyote magazine in 2004. Essay by Shinro Ohtake (Japanese).
  - New edition: Tokyo: Akio Nagasawa, 2022. Afterword by Moriyama (Japanese/English). Edition of 350 copies.
- Tokyo Boogie Woogie. Tokyo: Super Labo, 2018. ISBN 978-4-908512-26-1. Edition of 1000 copies.
- Tights in Shimotakaido. Tokyo: Akio Nagasawa, 2018. Edition of 600 copies.
- Lips! Lips! Lips!. Tokyo: Akio Nagasawa, 2018. Edition of 350 copies.
- Akai Kutsu Vol. 1. Kanagawa: Super Labo, 2019. ISBN 978-4-908512-76-6.
- Akai Kutsu Vol. 2. Kanagawa: Super Labo, 2019. ISBN 978-4-908512-77-3.
- Daido Moto. Paso Robles, CA: Nazraeli, 2019. Edition of 500 copies.
- Letters to N. Tokyo: Getsuyosha, 2021.
- Meta Meta. Tokyo: Akio Nagasawa, 2022. A series of old Polaroids. Edition of 350 copies.
- Dear Mr. Niépce. Tokyo: Akio Nagasawa, 2023. Afterword by Moriyama (Japanese/English).

=== Writings ===
- Mazu tashikarashisa no sekai o sutero: shashin to gengo no shisō (= "First Abandon the World of Pseudo-Certainty: Thoughts on Photography and Language"). Tokyo: Tabata Shoten, 1970. OCLC 53405730. With Nakahira Takuma, Takanashi Yutaka and Taki Kōji (Japanese).
- Places in My Memory (Memories of a Dog). Tokyo: Asahi Shinbunsha, 1984. Essays by Moriyama (Japanese).
  - Memories of a Dog. Final Chapter. Tokyo: Asahi Shinbunsha, 1998. ISBN 4-02-257278-7 (Japanese).
    - Revised editions of both books: Kawade Shobo Shinsha, 2001. ISBN 4-309-47414-4 (Japanese).
      - English translation: Memories of a Dog, Portland, OR: Nazraeli, 2004. ISBN 1-59005-067-3. Edition of 100 copies.
- A Dialogue with Photography. Seikyūsha, 1985. Compiled writings by Moriyama (Japanese).
  - Revised edition: Tokyo: Seikyūsha, 1995 (Japanese).
- From Photography/Toward Photography. Tokyo: Seikyūsha, 1995 (Japanese).
  - Revised edition of A Dialogue with Photography and From Photography/Toward Photography. Tokyo: Seikyūsha, 2006 (Japanese).
- How I Take Photographs. Laurence King, 2019. ISBN 978-1-78627-424-3. Co-written with Takeshi Nakamoto.

=== Compilations and monographs ===
- Mark Holborn (ed.).Record. London: Thames & Hudson, 2017. Selected work from Record No. 1–30. ISBN 978-0-500-54466-2.
  - Record 2. London: Thames & Hudson, 2024. ISBN 978-0-500-02763-9.
- Nogueira Thyago (ed.). Daido Moriyama. Munich/London/New York: Prestel, 2023. ISBN 978-3-7913-8925-7.
- Phaidon 55: Daido Moriyama. Text by Kazuo Ishii. London: Phaidon, 2001. ISBN 0-7148-4023-8.
- Phillips, Sandra S., Alexandra Munroe, and Daido Moriyama. Daido Moriyama: Stray Dog. San Francisco: San Francisco Museum of Modern Art, 1999. ISBN 0-918471-50-8.
- Photofile: Daido Moriyama. Introduction by Gabriel Bauret. London: Thames & Hudson, 2012. ISBN 978-0-500-41105-6.

== Film documentaries ==
- The Past Is Always New, the Future Is Always Nostalgic – Photographer Daido Moriyama (Kako wa itsumo atarashiku, mirai wa tsune ni natsukashii). Written and directed by Gen Iwama. Rapid Eye Movies, 2021.
