= WKM Gallery =

Contemporary art gallery in Hong Kong

WKM Gallery is a contemporary art gallery in Wong Chuk Hang, in Hong Kong. It was opened by William Kayne Mukai in 2023, in a space designed by the Japanese architect Koichi Futatsumata.

The inaugural exhibition Metamorphosis: Japan’s Evolving Society was held on 24 November 2023 featured twelve Japanese artists Yuichi Hirako (平子雄一), Tatsuhito Horikoshi (堀越達人), Ei Kaneko (金子英), Takumi Kokubo (小久保拓海), Akitsuna Komori (小森紀綱), Hiroya Kurata (倉田裕也), Tomona Matsukawa (松川朋奈), Ryo Matsuoka (松岡亮), Minori Oga (相賀美規), Hiro Sugiyama (ヒロ杉山), Ichi Tashiro (田城一) and TIDE. During the Art Basel week in Hong Kong in 2024, the gallery held its forth exhibition with Japanese photographer Daido Moriyama (森山大道).

== Selected exhibition ==
=== 2023 ===
- Metamorphosis: Japan’s Evolving Society
  - Artist: Yuichi Hirako (平子雄一), Tatsuhito Horikoshi (堀越達人), Ei Kaneko (金子英), Takumi Kokubo (小久保拓海), Akitsuna Komori (小森紀綱), Hiroya Kurata (倉田裕也), Tomona Matsukawa (松川朋奈), Ryo Matsuoka (松岡亮), Minori Oga (相賀美規), Hiro Sugiyama (ヒロ杉山), Ichi Tashiro (田城一) and TIDE

=== 2024 ===
- Take the Field, Take the Stage
  - Artist: Kuo Yen Fu (郭彥甫)
- The Hararakimono Project - Hong Kong (Part 1)
  - Artist: K-Narf and Shoko
- City Drifter
  - Artist: Daido Moriyama (森山大道)
- The Hararakimono Project - Hong Kong (Part 2)
  - Artist: K-Narf and Shoko
- Sky beyond words.
  - Artist: Ryo Matsuoka (松岡亮)
