= Yozo Hamaguchi =

Japanese copper printmaker

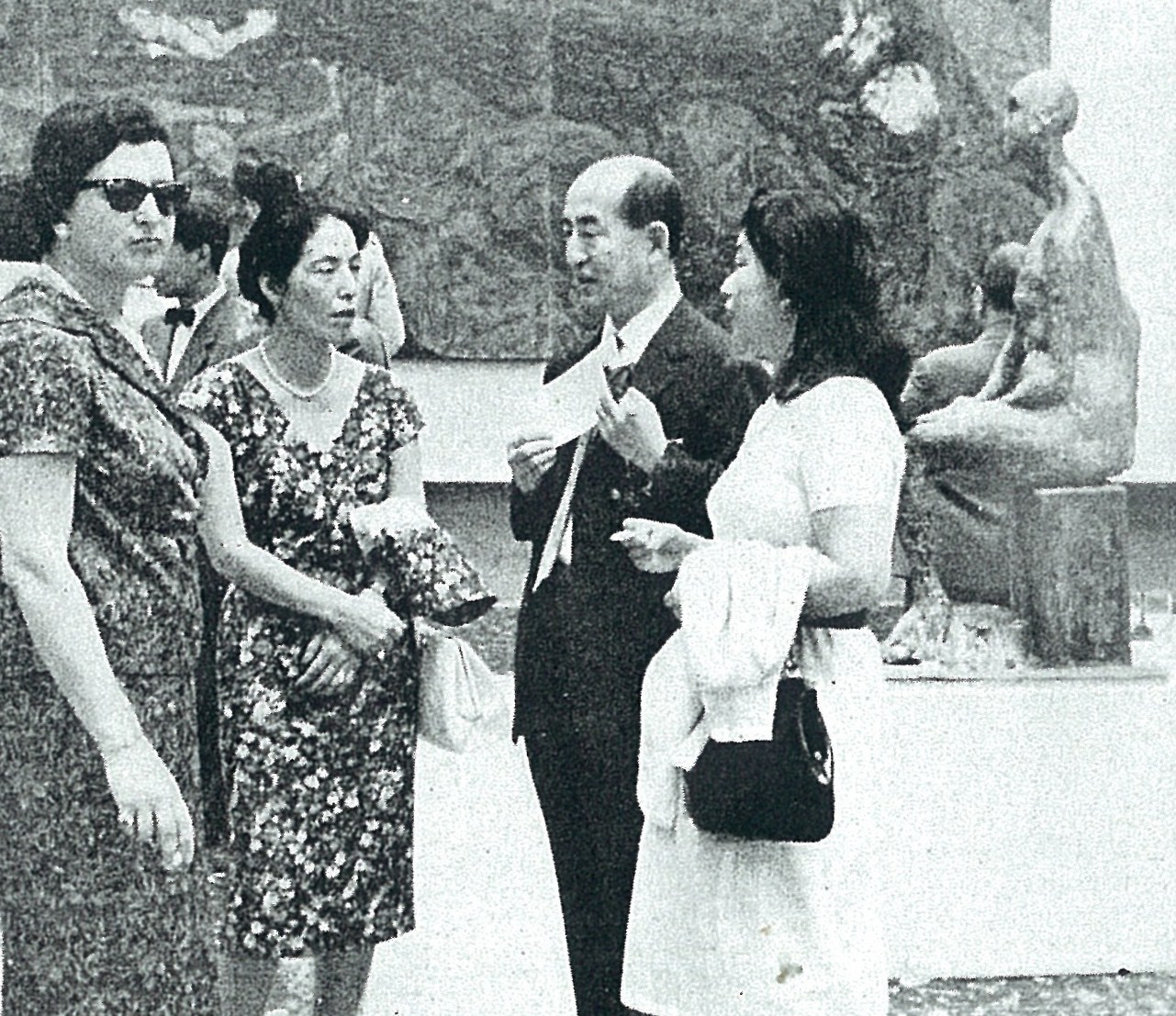
- Born: April 5, 1909; Hirogawa, Wakayama Prefecture, Japan
- Died: December 25, 2000 (aged 91); Tokyo, Japan
- Monuments: Musee Hamaguchi Yozo: Yamasa Collection
- Education: Tokyo University of the Arts (Did not complete)
- Known for: Mezzotint Printmaking
- Spouse: Keiko Minami (1939–2000)

Yozo Hamaguchi (April 5, 1909 – December 25, 2000) was a Japanese copper printmaker who specialized in mezzotint and was responsible for its resurgence as a printmaking medium in the mid-20th century. Hamaguchi's prints are distinguished for their careful attention to detail of boldly hued animals and objects contrasted against a velvety black background. The corpus of Hamaguchi's prints are focused on the still life genre.

Once considered a major printmaking medium in Europe throughout the 17th, 18th, and 19th Centuries, the influence and technological ingenuity of photography signaled the end of mezzotint printmaking as a modern reproducible form. However, Hamaguchi valued its emphasis on tonality and texture as expressed in a work's lighting and tactile qualities. By working in a European-born printing technique, Hamaguchi received praise from the European, American, and Japanese art centers for his distinct mezzotint printing methods and re-popularization of the long-ignored medium.

His works attained global exposure after Hamaguchi participated in the prestigious São Paulo Biennale in Brazil (1957) and was included in the Japanese Pavilion at the Venice Biennale in Italy (1960).

Hamaguchi's legacy is preserved in the Musee Hamaguchi Yozo that possesses much of his prints and it frequently organizes exhibitions centered on his printmaking, alongside works by his wife Keiko Minami and contemporary practitioners of mezzotint printmaking.

== Early life and education (1909–1930) ==
Hamaguchi was born in Hirogawa, Wakayama Prefecture, Japan to an upper-class family. His father, Gihei, was the 10th President of the Yamasa Corporation, a major soy sauce company. The Hamaguchi family's ties to the soy sauce industry extends as far back as 1645. While the family's wealth mainly derived from their centuries-old business, Hamaguchi's lineage demonstrated a long-held appreciation for the arts as his father was an avid collector of Nanga, Edo-period literati paintings. Additionally, one of Yozo's ancestors, Kansuke Hamaguchi, was a Nanga painter during the late Edo era.

From an early age, Hamaguchi desired to pursue a career in the arts instead of the family business. He entered the Tokyo Art School (now Tokyo University of the Arts) in 1927 to study sculpture, but left in 1930 to pursue an independent career. The Yōga style painter Ryuzaburo Umehara advised Hamaguchi to seek artistic training and inspiration in France as this was the means through which he developed his style.

== Early career (1930–1939) ==
Throughout the 1930s, Hamaguchi lived in Paris where he studied oil painting, watercolor, and copperplate printing. Eventually, Hamaguchi became more intent on a career as an oil painter and regularly created sketches and preparatory drawings for his planned paintings. During this period, Hamaguchi met and befriended the American poet e.e. Cummings, who soon became a great admirer of his sketches. Cummings remarked on the beauty of Hamaguchi's work and added they had the potential to become more aesthetically pleasing in print form. Shortly thereafter, Hamaguchi was introduced to the mezzotint medium after Cummings gifted him with a set of intaglio tools.

In 1937, Hamaguchi tried his hand at mezzotint and produced his first image, Cat, in which the titular subject is shown reclining with its front paw extended in an indiscernible white space.

== Career (1939–1985) ==
Hamaguchi's newfound artistic inspiration in Paris was interrupted by the start of World War II in 1939, and he subsequently returned to Japan. Over the course of the 1940s and 1950s, Hamaguchi further refined his mezzotint style and became a popular figure among Japanese art collectors as mezzotint was not yet familiar in Japan and was still considered a predominantly Western medium. Deemed a pioneer, the art world's enthusiasm for Hamaguchi's prints resulted in his first solo exhibition at the Formes Gallery in Tokyo in 1951.

Hamaguchi returned to France in 1953 to market his prints in the Parisian art scene. By then, the majority of his new works were monochrome copperplate etchings executed in gray, black, and white such as Gypsies (1954). His prints appealed to European collectors, and led to his acquisition of multiple prestigious awards in Japan, including the “Best Art Piece” at the Contemporary Art Exhibition of Japan. Concurrently, Hamaguchi became a member of the Salon d’Automne, an annual Parisian art exhibition that highlighted the latest developments in art, architecture, and design of the 20th century.

The year 1955 was a pivotal year in Hamaguchi's career as he revitalized mezzotint as a modern art medium and developed his signature style. Originally completed in black and white, Hamaguchi began to insert vibrant colors into his mezzoint prints that imbued them with an energetic liveliness. Moreover, he transformed his recognizable subjects of still life and city scenes into simplified, abstracted forms that took on entirely new visual meanings. Roofs of Paris (1956) was one of Hamaguchi's first colored mezzotints, and the innovativeness of his style is evident in the windowless rectangular and trapezoidal buildings that appear stacked or positioned in seemingly infinite rows. He employed non-localized colors as chimneys and edges of the roofs are depicted in blue, white, and light brown hues over blackened structures. Every building appears to emerge from a blackened void, which is a recurring visual motif that pervades most of the prints Hamaguchi later completed.

Hamaguchi's success led to his participation in countless art exhibitions and major art festivals around the world for the remaining decades of his life. In 1957, he received the Grant Prize of the International Printmaking Division at the São Paulo Biennial for three prints: Fish and Fruits (1954), Sole (1956), and Two Slices of Watermelon (1954). Hamaguchi had the prestigious honor to serve as a representative of the Japan Pavilion in the 1960 Venice Biennale.

Global enthusiasm for Hamaguchi's mezzotints led to his selection as the artist to design the official poster for the 1984 Sarajevo Winter Olympics, to which he incorporated his print Cherries and Blue Bowl (1976).

== Later career (1985–2000) ==
Hamaguchi's first major retrospective exhibition in Japan was held in 1985 at the Tokyo Yurakucho Art Forum and The National Museum of Modern Art, Osaka.

In 1993, Hamaguchi officially retired from printmaking due to his age and had his dealer/publisher complete his remaining prints. The Musee Hamaguchi Yozo was established in 1998 as a formal recognition of his contributions to Japanese art.

== Artistic style, technique, and content ==
Hamaguchi's importance in Japanese art history canon is cemented by his revival of the nearly-forgotten medium of mezzotint. Mezzotint printmaking originated in 17th century Europe and was distinguished for its incorporation of halftones in which gradations of light and shade produced forms instead of lines. An example of intaglio, artists utilized mezzotint to reproduce images of oil on canvas paintings that could be distributed in mass copies. Its emphasis on tonality and texture made it a popular printmaking technique throughout Europe, particularly in England and the Netherlands. However, mezzotint gradually became more obsolete in the 19th and 20th centuries with the rise of photography as an updated form of reproducible technology. Moreover, the painstaking labor and long periods of production that went into mezzotint printmaking were additional reasons for its waning influence. However, Hamaguchi's innovative approach in the modernization of mezzotint was based on his placement of colorfully illuminated objects that appeared to emerge from a blackened void.

Historically, most artists who employed mezzotint utilized etching in their creative process, whereas Hamaguchi preferred to cut lines into a copper plate before he applied acid. The burrs that were included after carving allowed the printing ink to remain in place, and they provided the details for the shading and contrasts. Similar to other printmakers, mezzotint was a lengthy process that meant each copper plate could take as long as several months for Hamaguchi to complete. The majority of Hamaguchi's mezzotints were completed in color, although he designed many prints in black, white, and gray. Stylistically, Hamaguchi demonstrated an up-close treatment of his subjects where animals and objects prominently occupy the foreground. The background is rendered in black or severely darkened shades of gray or brown. While the details of these figures are magnified to dominate major portions of the print, the physical scale of the works are quite small.

Art consultant Marjorie Katzenstein describes Hamaguchi's prints as embodying a “romantic surrealism” based on his ability to render isolated still life objects with vigor and luminosity. She remarked that much of Hamaguchi's work was inspired by the European Surrealists of the 1920s and 1930s such as Salvador Dalí and Giorgio de Chirico. Since artists like Dali explored themes related to sexuality, Katzenstein posits that Hamaguchi assumed a humorous approach to sexuality with his objects, particularly his fruits and vegetable subjects. In one example, Patrick’s Cherry (1980) features a cherry rising out of a darkened space and a source of light illuminating its grooved edge that is visually reminiscent of a pair of buttocks. Similarly, his earlier monochrome print Ears of Corn and Lemon (1959) suggests a reference to phallic penetration based on the elongation of the four ears of corn in the foreground, where one of them is faced in the opposite direction from the remaining three. Moreover, Katzenstein surmises the mezzotint's velvety soft texture could be another reference to sensuality.

== Personal life ==
Upon his return to Japan in 1939, Hamaguchi met the artist and author Keiko Minami and later married her. The couple moved to Paris in the 1950s after Hamaguchi decided to continue his career there, and they eventually settled in San Francisco from 1981 to 1996. Hamaguchi spent the final years of his life in Tokyo with Minami from 1996 to 2000.

== Death and legacy ==
Hamaguchi died of natural causes on Christmas Day of 2000.

During and after his lifetime, Hamaguchi's revitalization of the long-neglected mezzotint medium inspired new generations of mezzotint printmakers in Japan and beyond, including: Byron Bratt, H.W. Hwang, and Tomoe Yokoi.

== Musee Hamaguchi Yozo ==
In 1998, Hamaguchi lived to see the establishment of a museum in his honor at Nihonbashi, Chuo-kan, Tokyo. The Museum's collections comprises a significant body of Hamaguchi's works that cover the entirety of his career along with works by his wife Minami.

Since its founding, multiple exhibitions are held each year that highlight specific thematic, stylistic, and formal aspects of Hamaguchi's works. Often, exhibitions will explore the nature of mezzotint printmaking as a medium and display works by Hamaguchi alongside more recent contemporary mezzotint printmakers.

== Exhibitions ==
Select Solo Exhibitions

1951: Solo Exhibition – Formes Gallery, Tokyo, Japan

1985: Solo Exhibition – Yurakucho Art Forum, Tokyo, Japan

1999: Hamaguchi Yozo – Monochrome Works – Sakura City Museum of Art, Sakura, Japan

Select Group Exhibitions

1957: Sao Paulo Biennale – São Paulo, Brazil

1957: 1st International Biennial Print Exhibition – Tokyo, Japan

1960: Japan Pavilion – Venice Biennale, Venice, Italy

2004: Japanese Masters of Mezzotint – Worcester Museum of Art, Worcester, Massachusetts

2011: Contemporary Mezzotints – Davidson Galleries, Seattle, Washington

2012: Renewal and Revision: Japanese Prints of the 1950s and 60s – Smart Museum of Art, University of Chicago, Chicago, Illinois

2012: Art of Darkness: Japanese Mezzotints from the Hitch Collection – Freer Gallery of Art & Arthur M. Sackler Gallery, Smithsonian Institution, Washington, D.C.

2016: The Culture of Wine, Masters of Printmaking from the Vivanco Collection – Bilbao Fine Arts Museum, Bilbao, Spain

2017: Recollections – Hiroshima City Museum of Contemporary Art, Hiroshima, Japan

2018: Like a Face – Hiroshima City Museum of Contemporary Art, Hiroshima, Japan

2019: An Inner Landscape – Landscapes and Memories – Hiroshima City Museum of Contemporary Art, Hiroshima, Japan

2021: Rich Black Exhibition – Bunkamura Gallery, Tokyo, Japan

Retrospectives

1983: Retrospective – Vorpal Gallery, San Francisco, California

1985: Retrospective – The National Museum of Art, Osaka, Japan

1988: Retrospective of Prints and Studies – Tokyo Metropolitan Teien Art Museum, Tokyo, Japan

1998: Retrospective with Keiko Minami – Tokyu-Kichijoji Department Store, Musashino, Japan

2002: Master Print-Maker of the 20th Century – Hamaguchi Yozo

2018: Yozo Hamaguchi: Master of the Mezzotint – Museum of Art, DeLand, DeLand, Florida

2020: Happiness on the Horizon: The Copperplate Prints of Yozo Hamaguchi – Musee Hamaguchi Yozo/Yamasa Collection, Tokyo, Japan

== Awards and honors ==
- 1958: Ninth Mainichi Newspaper Art Award, International Exchange of Drawings and Engravings, Switzerland
- 1961: Grand Prize, International Biennale of Graphic Art, Yugoslavia
- 1966: Prize at Krakow International Print Biennial, Poland
- 1972: Prize at 4th Krakow International Print Biennial, Poland
- 1977: Sarajevo Fine Art Academy Prize, International Biennial of Graphic Art
- 1981: Cultural Award of Wakayama Prefecture
- 1982: Grand Prize, Northern California Regional Prize Competition
- 1984: “Cherries and Blue Bowl” used for commemorative posters at Sarajevo Winter Olympics
- 1986: Awarded Order of the Rising Sun Ribbon
- 1994: First Prize, North American Art Review

== Notable works ==
Year	Title	Medium
1937	Cat	Drypoint
1954	Spanish Oil Bottle	Mezzotint
1954	Fish and Fruits	Mezzotint
1954	Two Slices of Watermelon	Mezzotint
1956	Roofs of Paris	Color Mezzotint
1959	Ears of Corn and Lemon	Mezzotint
1976	Cherries and Blue Bowl	Color Mezzotint
1980	Patrick's Cherry	Color Mezzotint
1985	Bottles with Lemon and Red Wall	Color Mezzotint
1985–1992	Green Field	Color Mezzotint
1988–1990	22 Cherries series	Color Mezzotint

== Collections ==
The Metropolitan Museum of Art, New York; Bibliothèque nationale de France, Paris; Art Institute of Chicago, Chicago; The British Museum, London; Art Gallery of New South Wales, Australia; The National Gallery, Washington, D.C.; Wakayama Museum of Modern Art, Wakayama; Musee Hamaguchi Yozo/Yamasa Collection, Tokyo; Philadelphia Museum, Philadelphia; University of Alberta, Canada.
