= Keiko Minami =

Japanese artist (1911–2014)

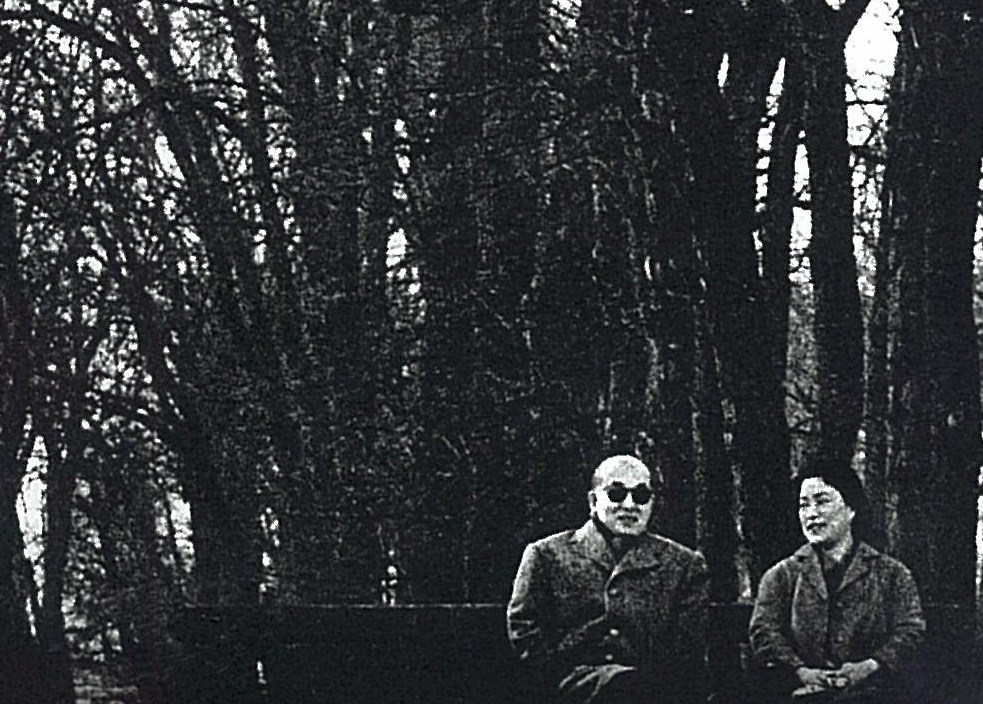
- Keiko Minami (right) & Yōzō Hamaguchi
- Born: 12 February 1911; Toyama Prefecture, Japan
- Died: 1 November 2004 (aged 93); Tokyo, Japan
- Education: School of Fine Arts Tokyo
- Known for: Aquatint, copperplate, engraving
- Spouse: Yōzō Hamaguchi (1909-2000)

Keiko Minami (南 桂子, Minami Keiko; 12 February 1911 – 1 December 2004) was a Japanese artist, aquatint engraver, and poet. She is best known for her pictograph-like aquatints with a whimsical, childlike aesthetic.

== Biography ==
Keiko Minami was born in the Imizu District of Toyama Prefecture in 1911. She was orphaned at a young age and was raised along with her sisters by their uncle. Her grandmother, Setsuko was the younger sister of the scientist Jōkichi Takamine. Her father, Tatsuyoshi Minami graduated from the University of Tokyo Law School and was once in the faculty of law at the University of Tokyo. Her mother, Kiyo, was a poet who studied in the Department of Japanese Literature at Japan Women's University.

Minami expressed an early interest in the arts. She painted and wrote poetry in high school, and studied the art of children's stories under the Japanese novelist and poet Sakae Tsuboi. She attended the School of Fine Arts Tokyo (東京美術学校), now called the Tokyo University of the Arts (東京藝術大学), from 1927 until 1929. Between early 30s and mid-40s, Minami likely returned to and stayed in Toyama. She got married and had a son.

After the war in 1945, Minami moved to Tokyo with her son. Introduced by Ineko Sata, she studied literature from writer Sakae Tsuboi and oil painting from Western-style painter Yoshio Mori.

In 1949, she exhibited her oil painting Lyric Poetry at the 13th Free Art Exhibition (自由美術展). Around that time, Minami met her future husband, the mezzotint artist Yōzō Hamaguchi at Mori's studio.

Minami and Hamaguchi moved to Paris in late 1953 where Minami began studying under Friedlaender, a pioneer in aquatint etching at the time, at the Johnny Friedlaender Print Institute. Shortly after beginning her studies under Friedlaender, Minami sold one of her first works to the City of Paris. Her artistic style was shaped by influences including Paul Klee, Hamaguchi, Friedlaender, and Yoshio Mori, alongside Japanese print artists, with Klee serving as a lifelong influence. She became a member of the Free Artist Association in 1955, and in 1956 her work Fūkei (風景, Landscape) was purchased by the French Ministry of Education. In 1957, Hitsujikai no shōjo (羊飼いの少女, Shepherdess with Her Flock) was selected to be on the Christmas card from the Museum of Modern Art in New York, and in 1958, Heiwa no ki (平和の木, Tree of Peace) was reprinted on the greeting card of UNICEF, and Minami was named Official Artist of the United Nations in 1959. More than 2 million of these greeting cards were issued and reprinted at least twice. Later on, UNICEF used Kodomo to hanataba to inu (子供と花束と犬, Children, Bouquets and Dogs) as part of its 1966 calendar.

In 1961, Heinz Berggruen, a dealer in modern prints known for his collection of 20th-century masterpieces, became Keiko's exclusive art dealer.

In the 1960s, Minami's interest in literature led her to take on illustration projects for writers. From 1968, eight of Minami's illustrations were included in The Complete Works of World Literature 46 Beauvoir / Duras (世界文学全集 46 ボーヴォワール/デュラス) and the year after, she illustrated Takehiko Fukunaga’s Childhood and Others (幼年 その他) — both published by Kodansha. Shuntarō Tanikawa’s poetry collection Utsumuku Seinen (うつむく青年, Depressed Youth), published in 1970, included Minami's illustrations and cover design. Tanikawa had once dedicated a poem to the artist, titled Dō no fetishizumu Minami Keiko-san ni (銅のフェティシズム 南桂子さんに, Copper Fetishism to Keiko Minami).

In 1981, Minami moved from Paris to San Francisco and returned to Japan in 1996 after more than forty years abroad. During this time domestic institutions continued to recognize Minami's artistic merit. By 1982, all guest rooms of the Imperial Hotel Tokyo were decorated with the artist's copperplate prints. In the hotel's informational magazine Imperial, which was launched in 1992, Minami's works were on the cover from No. 1 to No. 13 issues. Some guest rooms were still decorated with works from Minami in 2011.

In 1984, Minami was nominated as an honorary member of the Japan Print Association (日本版画協会). In 1998, Musée Hamaguchi Yōzō/Yamasa Collection (ミュゼ浜口陽三·ヤマサコレクション) was opened in Nihonbashi Kakigara-chō, Tokyo, and Minami's works are also on permanent display.

In 2000, her husband Yōzō Hamaguchi died and Minami died December 1, 2004, at a hospital in Minato-ku, Tokyo, due to myocardial infarction.

== Selected works ==
- Arbre de la paix (1958)
- Champs de printemps (1954)
- Bergère (1957)
- Lune (1954)
- Mer (1955)
- Trois sapins (1958)
- Little Girl with Bird (1956)
- Girl with Green Birds (1973)

== Books ==
- Minami, Keiko. Bonheur. Tokyo: Little More, Japan

== Exhibitions ==
=== Solo Exhibition ===
- 1960 Minami Keiko Exhibition, Nichido Gallery
- 1990 Minami Keiko Exhibition: The World of Fairy Tales in Copperplate Prints, Takaoka Art Museum
- 2005 Birds, Trees and Girls: The World of Copperplate Poetry: A Memorial Exhibition for Minami Keiko
- 2011-12 100th Anniversary of Keiko Minami Exhibition — Touring Kyoto, Takaoka, Kichijoji, Sakura, Tatebayashi
- 2016 Keiko Minami Exhibition: Along with the Work of Ichi Ogawa in the Wind, Musée Hamaguchi Yozo/Yamasa Collection
- 2017 Keiko Minami Copperplate Exhibition: Holding a Flower Basket, Musée Hamaguchi Yozo/Yamasa Collection
- 2019 Keiko Minami Exhibition: Koto, Koto. Kotori, Musée Hamaguchi Yozo/Yamasa Collection
- 2020 Where you can meet delicate colors beyond that tree: Keiko Minami Exhibition, Musée Hamaguchi Yozo/Yamasa Collection
- 2021 The Fairytale of Lines: Keiko Minami and Copperplate Painters, The Museum of Modern Art, Gunma
- 2021 Traces of Butterflies: Exhibition Commemorating the 110th Anniversary of Keiko Minami's Birth, Musée Hamaguchi Yozo/Yamasa Collection

=== Group Exhibition ===
- 1957-66 1st to 5th Tokyo International Print Biennale, Yomiuri Kaikan
- 1957 2nd Ljubljana International Print Biennale, Ljubljana Museum of Modern Art
- 1959 3rd Ljubljana International Print Biennale, Ljubljana Museum of Modern Art
- 1959 27th Japan Print Association Exhibition, Tokyo Metropolitan Art Museum
- 1961 Friedlaender·Hamaguchi·Minami Prints Exhibition, Museum of Modern Art, Kamakura & Hayama
- 1961 6th Japan International Art Exhibition, Tokyo Metropolitan Art Museum
- 1961 Contemporary Japanese Print Exhibition, Kyoto City Museum of Art
- 1963 7th Japan International Art Exhibition, Tokyo Metropolitan Art Museum
- 1964 32nd Japan Print Association Exhibition, Tokyo Metropolitan Art Museum
- 1964 Postwar Contemporary Japanese Art Exhibition, Kanagawa Prefectural Museum of Modern Art
- 1965 6th Ljubljana International Print Biennale, Ljubljana Museum of Modern Art
- 1965 8th Japan International Art Exhibition, Tokyo Metropolitan Art Museum
- 1965 33rd Japan Print Association Exhibition, Tokyo Metropolitan Art Museum
- 1965 Exhibition of Japanese Artists Overseas Europe and America, The National Museum of Modern Art, Tokyo
- 1966 34th Japan Print Association Exhibition, Tokyo Metropolitan Art Museum
- 1966 100 Years of Prints from the Meiji Era to the Present, Osaka Nakanoshima Asahi Building Cultural Hall
- 1967 9th Japan International Art Exhibition, Tokyo Metropolitan Art Museum
- 1967 Modern Japanese Prints, The National Museum of Modern Art, Tokyo
- 1971 Postwar Art Chronicle Exhibition, Kanagawa Prefectural Museum of Modern Art
- 1972-73 Japanese Writers in Europe, The National Museum of Modern Art, Kyoto & The National Museum of Modern Art, Tokyo
- 1973 Modern Japanese Print Exhibition, Tochigi Prefectural Museum of Art
- 1974 Modern Japanese Print Exhibition, Nara Prefectural Museum of Art
- 1982 50th Japan Print Association Exhibition, Tokyo Metropolitan Art Museum
- 1983 Transforming Image 20th Century Japanese Prints, St. Louis Art Museum
- 1985 Graphic Art & Design Exhibition of Contemporary Japanese Art, Toyama Prefectural Museum of Modern Art
- 1985 Contemporary Print Trajectory Exhibition, Fukushima Prefectural Museum of Art
- 1988 Contemporary Japanese Prints 1950–1980, Kanagawa Prefectural Museum of Modern Art
- 1991 Minami Keiko & Aiko Miyawaki Exhibition, Takaoka Art Museum
- 1992 10 Copperplate Painters Exhibition, Kanagawa Prefectural Museum of Modern Art
- 2003 Poetry and Encountering with Yozo Hamaguchi and Minami Keiko, Nerima Art Museum

== Museum Collections & Galleries ==
- Portland Art Museum
- The National Museum of Modern Art, Tokyo
- The National Museum of Art, Osaka
- The National Museum of Modern Art, Kyoto
- Musée Hamaguchi Yozo/Yamasa Collection
- Kaki Gallery
- Suiha Gallery
