= Yoshio Kitayama =

Japanese artist (born 1948)

Yoshio Kitayama (北山善夫, born 1948) is a Japanese artist born in Shiga prefecture in 1948 and based in Kyoto. He represented Japan for the 40th Venice Biennale in 1982 and has participated in the Echigo-Tsumari Art Triennial and the Setouchi Triennial.

He is known for his two-dimensional works which fall into a few categories: clay figures; works consisting of countless small circles are painstakingly done on Japanese style paper using pencil; or sculptures using bamboo twigs.

== Early life ==
Kitayama became ill and almost died of illness at the age of ten. Kitayama began drawing at a young age and studied various genres of fine arts such as oil painting, sculpture, dessin sketching, etching, and Japanese ink painting. Upon graduating from Junior High School, he began working in traditional Japanese yuzen dyeing practice in Kyoto at 16. He says the pattern design aspect of this work experience gave him valuable lessons in color usage, expression of two and three-dimensional images, and transferring realism to abstraction.

When Kitayama was 18, he experienced a recurrence of his illness and was bedridden for one year. During that time, he decided to commit himself to his artistic aspirations. He began to exhibit his works when he was in his late 20s. His early works were influenced by the Mono-ha, and he studied various Western historical art movements.

== Early works ==
In an essay describing Kitayama's work, art historian Lise Seisbøll explains the early trajectory of Kitayama's works. At first, he had restricted his drawings to a flat surface, often using frottage, but upon seeing the way his children created images unconfined by the two-dimensional surface, Kitayama began experimenting with incorporating bamboo twigs into his two-dimensional drawings. Seisbøll frames Kitayama's experimentation with bamboo in the post-Mono-ha period of Japanese art. She describes Mono-ha's focus on “materials that are artistically new but nationally familiar… especially wood, stone and paper.. Generally speaking the works also become architectonic, since they gain more and more affinity with the art of Japanese gardening, so rich in tradition.” His experimentation with bamboo in his two dimensional works lead to completely three-dimensional works as he began to create more structurally intricate sculptures using bamboo, paper, leather, and cloth. Although he has continued to work in drawing and in sculpture, both small and large scale, bamboo is a through line in the evolution of Kitayama's three-dimensional oeuvre. In the conclusion of her essay, Seisbøll references Japanese art critic Nakahara Yusuke's analysis of Kitayama's work:

Kitayama retains his Japanesesness precisely because of the extremely personal adaption of his materials. By his choice of materials and his technique the artist has preserved a strong feeling of nature… Kitayama's works seem therefore to offer a new interpretation of the oriental kite tradition, while using an artistic language that seems familiar to the Western Eye.

== Large-scale works ==
In the 1990s, Kitayama's three-dimensional sculptures became much more prominent, filling gallery spaces. He participated in the 1982 Venice Biennale with Naoyoshi Hikosaka and Tadashi Kawamata, and presented a large-scale three-dimensional works composed of Japanese paper, bamboo, leather, and cloth. His works were also included in the Asian Art Biennale in Bangladesh in 1983 and 2003 and the Indian Triennale in 1991.

Kitayama's works were also included in the Echigo-Tsumari Art Triennale in 2000 with an installation of a large-scale sculpture of bamboo and paper which hung in the Tsuchikura Branch Elementary School. His works were also included in the Setouchi Triennale. His works were also included in the Oku-Noto Triennale in 2023. He also showed at The Carnegie International in 1982 in Pittsburgh, Pennsylvania.

== Japanese paper works ==
In his essay for the 11th Asian Art Biennale, Bangladesh 2003, Mori Tsukasa writes that early in Kitayama's career, he had tried to make two-dimensional works but was frustrated with their lack of impact, which led him to his early relief-like works incorporating bamboo twigs. But as his subject matter of eternal themes such as life, death, and the universe became apparent to him, he "realized that 'the death of painting,' which he had experienced several times, was a natural consequence of the loss of a theme or subject matter. He gradually mastered ways of addressing these themes, developing motifs with powerful symbolism from drawings of the crucifixion or nirvana." In his review of an exhibition at MEM gallery in the Japan Times, Matthew Larking posits that Kitayama's imagery is connected to "Buddhist mandalas, structures representing both a cosmos and a representation of an unconscious self. He also sees in these works an endless chain of life and death that began with the Big Bang which he situates himself within."

Kitayama's washi paper works consists of tens of thousands of small circles, which are painstakingly composed over hours of single-minded focus. Mori explains that Kitayama “condenses hundreds of details, which are the vestiges of his efforts, also numerous and fragmented, toward infinite time and space to create the amorphous and incomplete complex. That is, a synthetic and autonomic whole is not conceived from the beginning, and the self is crystallized in a chain of details, which are signs of his physical relationship with local time and space.” Mori says the arduous process that Kitayama endeavors coalesces in his washi works as a "self-realization as generation of a physical relationship with time and space."

Mori draws similarities between Kitayama's three-dimensional assemblages that utilize various materials and his two-dimensional washi works, quoting Kitayama's explanation of his artwork that Kitayama feels "there is something awful behind, which cannot be divided in spite of thousands of efforts." Mori expands on Kitayama's words saying that the coexistence of "'the unseizable behind' and the 'attitude to seize' in spite of its impossibility” is at the core of Kitayama's artistic endeavors.

Due to this contradiction or impossibility that Kitayama has set out to accomplish, Mori explains that his three-dimensional and two-dimensional works “show an attachment to each of the numerous details… The whole approach of work perceived through the eyes from a certain distance does not have any priority to any particular detail; its entire view as a constructed object is developed little by little in tracing and wearing details one by one. But we cannot find the whole, even if we go on to the end, because the relationship between details and the succession of their connected points are most significant than the whole.”

== Exhibitions ==
Major group exhibitions include Kansai Contemporary Art of the 1980s, held at the Hyogo Prefectural Museum of Contemporary Art in 2022. ECCE HOMO The Human Images in Contemporary Art and The Aesthetics of Contemporary Japan at The National Museum of Art, Osaka, in 2016 and 2022.

His works have been included in various group exhibitions domestic and international in institutions such as the Kyoto Municipal Museum of Art, Kyoto; Tokyo Metropolitan Museum of Art, Tokyo; National Museum of Contemporary Art Seoul, Korea; Musée d'Art et d'Histoire, Geneva, Switzerland; The New Museum of Modern Art, Toyama; Gifu Prefectural Art Museum, Gifu; Leopold-Hoesch-Museum, Düren, Germany; and others.

His works are included in collections at the Toyota Municipal Museum of Art, The National Museum of Art, Osaka, The Shiga Museum of Art, Nagoya City Art Museum, Aichi Prefectural Museum of Art and others.
