= Takuma Nakahira =

Japanese photographer and theorist (1938–2015)

Takuma Nakahira (中平 卓馬, Nakahira Takuma; July 6, 1938 – September 1, 2015) was a Japanese photographer, critic, and theorist. He was a member of the seminal photography collective Provoke, played a central role in developing the theorization of landscape discourse (fūkei-ron), and was one of the most prominent voices in 1970s Japanese photography.

== Life and work ==
Born in Tokyo, Nakahira attended the Tokyo University of Foreign Studies, from which he graduated in 1963 with a degree in Spanish. After graduation, he began working as an editor at the art magazine Contemporary view (Gendai no me), during which time he published his work under the pseudonym of Akira Yuzuki (柚木明).

=== Provoke (1968–70) ===
Two years later, he left the magazine in order to help organize the major 1968 exhibition One Hundred Years of Photography: The History of Japanese Photographic Expression at the invitation of Shōmei Tōmatsu, an effort to which photo critic Kōji Taki also contributed. In 1968, he and Taki teamed up with photographer Yutaka Takanashi, and critic Takahiko Okada, to found the magazine Provoke: Provocative documents for the sake of thought. By the second issue, Daidō Moriyama had joined the group, but Provoke ceased publication with its third issue, First discard the world of pseudocertainty: the thinking behind photography and language, in March 1970. Nakahira and the other Provoke members were well known for what was termed their "are, bure, boke" (rough, blurry, and out of focus) style, associated with spontaneity and thus supposedly a more direct confrontation with reality in that it would circumvent conscious control.

=== For a Language to Come (1970) and Landscape Discourse ===
While working on Provoke, Nakahira published his first photobook, For a Language to Come (Kitarubeki kotoba no tame ni), which has been described as "a masterpiece of reductionism." Ryūichi Kaneko and Ivan Vartanian feature the book prominently in their book on seminal Japanese photobooks of the 1960s and 70s, and Martin Parr and Gerry Badger include it in the first volume of their international photobook history. Vartanian describes the volume as exemplary of Provoke's vision and concept of photography in Nakahira's use of the are, bure, boke style, but also for presenting full-bleed snapshots of anonymous corners of Tokyo that either cross over or abut each other at the book's gutter. Vartanian argues that "By erasing the conventional functionality of the photograph as document, memory, verification, emotion, and narrative, he revealed the illusory nature of photography as a conduit of information or portrayal of reality, while at the same time underscoring the only tangible reality available to the viewer—the printed image," eschewing documentation of social issues to instead present a personal, diaristic perspective.

However, cultural historian Franz Prichard reads the book as intimately concerned with the social circumstances of 1970s Tokyo by considering the volume's relationship Nakahira's perspective on fukei-ron (landscape discourse). Prichard argues that these images function as fragments of an urban landscape in transition, "suspended between construction and destruction, and marked by the grotesque expansion and remaking of postwar urban Japan." Nakahira, filmmaker Masao Adachi, and critic Yūsuke Nakahara famously articulated Japanese landscape discourse in a roundtable for the peridocal Shashin eizō (Photo Image) in October 1970, although the concept originated with critic Masao Matsuda's writings on the 1969 film AKA Serial Killer, on which Adachi and Matsuda had collaborated. AKA Serial Killer questioned the common narrative about the source of serial killer Norio Nagayama's criminal conduct as being rooted in environment, especially the socioeconomic circumstances of his upbringing, in order to complicate the oppositional binary structure of Japanese political thought in the late 1960s. Toward this end, the film traced his movements by recording landscape shots at the sites in which he had lived and presenting them in succession. The intended effect was a flattening of the individuality of these sites into an "all encompassing constellation of power spanning both rural peripheries and urban centers," which Prichard relates to the photographs of trains, nighttime streets, busses, wharves, and other material examples of urban infrastructure that Nakahira's camera captured in For a Language to Come. This perspective on contemporary landscape as menacingly homogeneous and tied to capitalist geopolitics becomes clear in Nakahira's comments during the 1970 roundtable:

But, specifically, my interest, or what concerns me, is that I am looking, I look, and the world is separated from me by my looking. This separated world is what I think of as landscape. I just look into the distance, unable to intervene in the landscape before me as a living being. This is frustrating and also tragic. This is how I have always felt when looking through the viewfinder. But at the same time, isn't my look thrown back at me by this very landscape, and then I am the one being looked at? Maybe it is the world that has the gaze. It manifests itself as a frightening thing, but I'm most interested in that reversal in recognition. For Matsuda, it is ridiculous to refere to the indigenous or to an opposition of the local or periphery to the center, since the logic of Japanese imperialism or Japanese capitalism has painted over everything so that it appears only as an homogeneous landscape. You cannot help but recognize that the more you look at this landscape, the more you are being seen. The question is how to endure the enemy's gaze. I'm sure that Matsuda wrote about how crucial it is for us to cut through or overturn this landscape at this moment in time.

Scholars including Prichard, film historian Yuriko Furuhata, art historian Ken Yoshida, and curator Charles Merewether highlight the importance of this critique of the effects of Japanese rapid-growth-era capitalism and its pursuit of progress on the Japanese landscape in 1970 for Provoke generally, but especially for Nakahira. Nakahira was thus disturbed to find this are, bure, boke style appropriated by commercial advertising, most notably by Japan Railways' Discover Japan campaign. Discover Japan had started the same year that For a Language to Come was published as a means of promoting travel on the newly expanded national railways after the inevitable post-Expo '70 tourism drop-off, and were thus closely linked with high-growth-era capitalism, Japanese nationalism, and Cold War era geopolitics. Nakahira published a response to this campaign in a collaboration with photographer Kazuo Kitai for the May 1972 issue of Asahi Camera entitled "Discovered Japan." Against this appropriation of his earlier style, Nakahira gathered together images of urban detritus that Yoshida describes as "records of effacement and exhaustion—taken at sites of dilapidation and depression incapable of supporting adequate life...Deracinated things fail to establish a cohesive whole or a syntactic logic as remnants loiter meaninglessly in a state of any-space-whatever: and old electric pole, a canted shot of a sedan, trash, a dead fish." Prichard identifies this incident as an important inflection point in Nakahira's post-Provoke practice that leads him to take a critical stance toward his idealistic belief in the ability of a particular style to avoid co-optation by the forces of commodification.

=== Circulation: Date, Place, Event (1971) ===
In 1971, fellow Provoke alum and Japanese commissioner for the 7th Paris Biennial Okada Takahiko invited Nakahira to participate in the international event. Rather than showing existing work at this prominent platform, Nakahira chose to create an entirely new work based on his encounter with Paris, entitled Circulation: Date Place, Event. Over the course of a week, Nakahira shot approximately two hundred images per day, developing them as 8 x 10 prints and hanging them in the exhibition space while they were still wet. Accordingly, the installation grew over the course of the week, lending the work a performative element that historian and curator Yuri Mitsuda argues Nakahira himself saw as transforming his photographs into actions, exploring the "relationship surrounding 'I who sees' and 'I who is seen.' " Prichard notes that, unlike his previous Provoke-era works, this photographic series also involved a process of remediation in which one kind of media is incorporated into another kind of media, as seen in the inclusion of photographs of print media, television screens, street signs, teletype news, and more within the installation. Combined with the title "Circulation," this work is generally understood as dealing with photography as an action within the present moment. Mitsuda thus reads the project as an abandonment of universality, while Prichard expands on this stance to position it as a method for critiquing of local urban media ecologies through the example of Paris in 1971.

=== Why an Illustrated Botanical Dictionary (1973–77) ===
By the time Nakahira published Why an Illustrated Botanical Dictionary (Naze, shokubutsu zukan ka) in 1973, he had definitively shifted away from the style of are, bure, boke and was instead moving towards a type of catalog photography stripped of the sentimentality of handheld photography, a photography resembling the illustrations of reference books. The book itself combined photographs he had previously published in other periodicals from 1971 to 1973 with texts written between 1967 and '72. It is widely understood that the shift effected in this volume toward the idea of a dictionary was an attempt to strip away the authorial hand and present the world around Nakahira in a more stark and revealing form, but the interpretation of what that means remains contentious. Phillip Charrier contends that this represents a return to early post-WWII Japanese photographic discussions of "realism" as seeking an objective truth based on the dehumanized, scientific-mechanical objectivity of the camera's lens. This argument leads Charrier to critique Nakahira for a "camera-centric realist photography," producing highly technical, "ordinary" or "boring" images that he claims are neither conceptual nor deconstructive no matter how similar they may look to other postmodern photography.

In contrast to Charrier's reading Prichard reads the texts and images as following a process-based approach on the model of a dictionary. In this reading, the dictionary is, according to Nakahira's introductory essay in the volume, "never a whole that has been constructed by privileging something and making that its center...but rather the parts always remain parts...The method of the illustrated dictionary is absolute juxtaposition. It is this method of juxtaposition, or enumeration, that must be my method." Prichard points to how these already existing texts and images, published in other sources and arranged by date rather than theme, follow the logic of an illustrated dictionary by both denying the hand of the author in organizing the parts and by leaving the assembled elements as fragments, void of an overarching meaning. Yet in relating this methodology to that of Nakahira's 1971 Circulation work, and further noting that these images and texts were previously published in the Japanese mediasphere, Prichard sees Why an Illustrated Botanical Dictionary as a continuation of the critique of media ecologies.

=== Overflow and Archipelagic Thought, 1974–77 ===
Prichard further reads Nakahira's 1974 installation Overflow (Hanran, a homonym for "revolt"), which was produced as Nakahira was assembling Why and Illustrated Botanical Dictionary and marks Nakahira's first use of color photography in a museum installation, as a continuation of the methodology of Why an Illustrated Botanical Dictionary. Like the book, most of the photographs in Overflow had been previously published in print media such as Asahi Journal between 1969 and 74. Featuring forty-eight photographs of details of urban space, arranged in an irregular horizontal formation, Prichard reads the installation as an attempt to "reorient the flows of [media] inundation into those of revolt," positing a role for photography in advancing the cause of critiquing contemporary media ecologies.

Sometime after Why an Illustrated Botanical Dictionary, in the mid-1970s, Nakahira decided to mark the transition in his approach by burning most of the negatives of his earlier work, save those for Circulation. From 1974 Nakahira began photographing in Okinawa, the Amami Islands, and Tokara Islands, all to the south of mainland Japan. From 1976 he further undertook projects photographing Hong Kong, Macao, Singapore, Spain and Morocco. Considering his interest in problems of politics, infrastructure, and media, both photography historian and critic Rei Masuda and Prichard read these projects as seeking connections between Japan and Southeast Asia under the conditions of Cold War geopolitics and the 1970s discourse of the Third World. One point of reference for Nakahira's interest in these subjects were the Yaponesia essays by Amami-based Tohoku writer Toshio Shimao. Shimao's essays, though sometimes overly reliant on stereotypes of the south, proposed thinking of Japan as connected to Southeast Asia rather than mainland Asia. These ideas proved influential not only for Nakahira, but also for Shōmei Tōmatsu, who was also photographing Okinawa around this time, and the Japanese documentary film collective Nihon Documentarist Union. Still, Nakahira's approach to sites at the edges of the Japanese archipelago were more complex than Shimao's concept of Yaponesia. Prichard specifically positions Nakahira's photographs of Tokara as playing with the question of thresholds and boundaries of community identification through the photographic gaze. He describes the images in this series as holding double-readings that treat elements of the landscape, such as the sea, as borders. Such images can portray the act of "seeing as a traveler looking 'out' over an unfamiliar road to the sea over which they came, or seeing as an islander looking across the intimately familiar road to the wall of the sea that encloses them from the 'outside.' "

=== Alcohol poisoning and post-1977 practice ===
In 1977, at the age of 39, Nakahira suffered alcohol poisoning and fell into a coma. As a result of this trauma, he suffered permanent memory loss and aphasia, effectively ending his prolific writings. This event has also conventionally been understood as marking a change in his photographic practice since, after a hiatus from his image making activities, he returned to the medium in a style quite distinct from that for which he was known. Curator and photo critic Kuraishi Shino and Masuda, however, argue that in spite of any stylistic differences with his earlier work, Nakahira's post-1977 practice should be understood as a conceptual continuation of the project he embarked on in 1973 with Why an Illustrated Botanical Dictionary. Nakahira's post-1977 photographs were collected in three photobooks: A New Gaze (1983), Adieu à X (1989), and Hysteric Six Nakahira Takuma (2002). Kuraishi describes Nakahira's later work as having thrown away "prejudice and advanced planning" in favor of a "direct, unmediated encounter with the world that includes the subject." In 1990, Nakahira was presented with the Society of Photography Award by the Tokyo-based Society of Photography, alongside Seiichi Furuya and Nobuyoshi Araki.

=== Degree Zero—Yokohama (2003) ===
In 2003, renowned photography critic Shino Kuraishi organized a retrospective of Nakahira's work at the Yokohama Museum of Art. The exhibition brought together some 800 of Nakahira's best known works and documents from the 1960s alongside newer works from after his 1977 accident. The show was divided into six sections: For a Language to Come, 1964–73; Magazine Work, 1964–74; Circulation: Date, Time, Event, 1971; Overflow/City, Trap 1974; A New Gaze, 1975–89; and Degree Zero—Yokohama 1993–2003. The title of the show was meant to reference Nakahira's experience restarting his photography practice in Yokohama after his illness, and the prominent role Yokohama played in Nakahira's post-illness practice as the site of his everyday experience. Degree Zero—Yokohama ultimately presented Nakahira as a staunch critic of modernity, as well as photography as a medium that developed alongside modernity, characterising his approach as focused on direct encounters with subjects that "both dismantle and, at the same time regenerate the photographers' sense of self."

=== Legacy ===
While Nakahira was always an important figure within Japanese photographic circles, the upsurge in research and exhibitions on post-WWII Japanese photography since the 2000s has led to a reevaluation of Nakahira's contributions to Japanese photographic, media, and art discourses in recent years, especially outside of Japan. His work has been included in recent seminal exhibitions of Japanese post-WWII art including the Getty Research Institute's Art, Anti-Art, Non-Art: Experimentation in the Public Sphere in Postwar Japan, 1950-1970 (2007), the Museum of Modern Art's Tokyo: 1955-1970 (2012), the Museum of Fine Arts Houston's For a New World to Come: Experiments in Japanese Art and Photography 1968–1979 (2015), National Museum of Modern Art, Tokyo's Things: Rethinking Japanese Photography and Art in the 1970s (2015), and the Art Institute of Chicago's Provoke: Photography in Japan between Protest and Performance, 1960-1975 (2017).

== Publications ==
- Provoke magazine
  - Tokyo: Provoke-sha, November 1968-March 1970 OCLC 79849187
  - The Japanese Box - Facsimile reprint of six rare photographic publications of the Provoke era, Paris/Göttingen: Edition 7L / Steidl, 2001. ISBN 9783882433012
  - Tokyo: Nitesha, 2018 (facsimile version) OCLC 1079065575
- Kitarubeki kotoba no tame ni = For a Language to Come
  - Tokyo: Fūdosha, 1970. With text by Nakahira. OCLC 54748840
  - Tokyo: Osiris, 2010. With texts by Nakahira, "Has Photography Been Able to Provoke Language?", "Rebellion Against the Landscape: Fire at the Limits of my Perpetual Gazing . . ." and "Look at the City or, the Look from the City", translated by Franz K. Prichard. ISBN 9784990123987
- Why an Illustrated Botanical Dictionary
  - Tokyo: Shōbun sha, 1973. OCLC 835145367
  - Tokyo: Chikuma Gakugei Bunko, 2007. ISBN 9784480091109
- 「新たなる凝視」(Aratanaru gyōshi), Shōbunsha, 1983. OCLC 10162084
- Adieu à X (AX)
  - Tokyo: Kawade Shobō Shinsha, 1989. ISBN 978-4-309-26111-9.
  - Tokyo: Kawade Shobō Shinsha, 2006. ISBN 978-4-309-26873-6.
- 「日本の写真家36 中平卓馬」, Iwanami Shoten, 1999. ISBN 978-4-00-008376-8.
- Hysteric Six: Takuma Nakahira, Hysteric Glamour: 2002. OCLC 680468397
- Degree Zero: Yokohama, Tokyo: Osiris, 2003. ISBN 978-4-9901239-1-8. (First half of catalogue for solo show at Yokohama Museum of Art)
- 「都市 風景 図鑑」 (Toshi fūkei zukan), Tokyo: Getsuyōsha, 2011. ISBN 978-4-901477-82-6.
- Takuma Nakahira Documentary, Tokyo: Akio Nagasawa Publishing, 2011. ISBN 978-4-904883-34-1.
- サーキュレーション : 日付、場所、行為 (Circulation: Date, Place, Events), Tokyo: Osiris, 2012. ISBN 9784905254010
- 「沖縄写真家シリーズ 琉球烈像 第8巻 沖縄・奄美・吐カ喇 1974-1978」 (Okinawa shashinka shirīzu Ryūkyū retsuzō #8 Okinawa・Amami・Tokara). Tokyo: Miraisha, 2012. ISBN 978-4-624-90028-1.
- 氾濫 (Overflow), Tokyo: Case, 2018. Text in English and Japanese. ISBN 9784908526190

== Sources (English Language) ==
- Brand, Heather, ed. (2015). For a new world to come: experiments in Japanese art and photography, 1968–1979. Houston: Houston Museum of Fine Arts.
- Charrier, Philip (2017). "Nakahira Takuma's 'Why an Illustrated Botanical Dictionary?' (1973) and the Quest for 'True' Photographic Realism in Post-War Japan," Japan Forum 29.
- Chong, Doryun; Kajiya, Kenji; Sumitomo, Fumihiko; Hayashi, Michio, eds. From postwar to postmodern: art in Japan 1945-1989: primary documents. New York: Museum of Modern Art.
- Dufour, Diane; Witkovsky, Matthew S.; Forbes, Duncan; Moser, Walter, eds. (2016). Provoke: between protest and performance : photography in Japan 1960-1975. Göttingen: Steidl.
- Kim, Gewon (2015). "Reframing 'Hokkaido Photography': Style, Politics, and Documentary Photography in 1960s Japan." History of Photography 39.4 (December 15, 2015). p. 348-365.
- Furuhata, Yuriko (2013). Cinema of actuality: Japanese avant-garde filmmaking in the season of image politics. Durham: Duke University Press. p. 117–18.
- Huie, Bonnie (2010). "Made in Japan: Review of Japanese Photobooks of the 1960s and '70s, by Ryuichi Kaneko and Ivan Vartanian, and Takuma Nakahira: For a Language to Come. Afterimage, 38.3 (November/December 2010).
- Kaneko, Ryūichi; Vartanian, Ivan (2009). Japanese photobooks of the 1960s and '70s (1st ed.). New York: Aperture.
- Mitsuda, Yuri (2012). "Trauma and Deliverance: Portraits of Avant Garde-Artists in Japan, 1955-1970" [trans. Reiko Tomii]. Tokyo, 1955-1970: a new avant-garde. ed. Doryun Chong. New York: Museum of Modern Art.
- Nakahira, Takuma (2006). "Self-Change in the Act of Shooting" and "Excerpt from 'Why an Illustrated Botanical Dictionary.' " Setting Sun: Writings by Japanese Photographers, eds. Ivan Vartanian, Akihiro Hatanaka, Yutaka Kambayashi. New York: Aperture. p. 86-88 and 125-131.
- Iizawa, Kōtarō (2003). "The Evolution of Postwar Photography". The History of Japanese Photography. eds. Anne Tucker, Hōtarō Iizawa, Naoyuki Kinoshita. New Haven: Yale University Press in association with the Museum of Fine Arts, Houston. p. 210-25.
- Parr, Martin; Badger, Gerry (2004). The Photobook: a history, Volume 1. London: Phaidon Press.
- Prichard, Franz (2016). "Nakahira Takuma and the Photographic Topographies of Possibility." Spaces of Possibility: In, Between, and Beyond Korea and Japan. eds. Clark W. Sorensen and Andrea Arai. Seattle: University of Washington Press.
- Prichard, Franz (2019). Residual futures: the urban ecologies of literary and visual media of 1960s and 1970s Japan. New York: Columbia University Press.
- Prichard, Franz (2015). "Takuma Nakahira (1938-2015)," Artforum, 21 December.
- Prichard, Franz (2015). "Takuma Nakahira: At the Limits of the Gaze," Aperture, 219 (July 2015).
- [http://www.losquaderno.professionaldreamers.net/wp<wbr></wbr>-content/uploads/2015/02/losquaderno35.pdf Stojkovic, Jelena (2015). "For a City to Come: The Material of Takuma Nakahira's Photography" Lo Squaderno 35 (March 2015). p. 17-21.]
- Yoshida, K. (2021). Avant-garde art and nondominant thought in postwar Japan: image, matter, separation. Abingdon, Oxon: Routledge. p. 177–83.
