= Provoke (magazine) =

Japanese photography magazine, 1968–1969

- Cover of the third issue
- Categories: Fine Arts
- Country: Japan

Provoke (Purovōku, プロヴォーク), with its subtitle of Provocative Materials for Thought (Note: Variously also translated as 'provocative resources for thought', 'provocative materials for thinkers', 'provocative documents for the sake of thought' and 'provocative documents for the pursuit of ideas') (Shisō no tame no chōhatsuteki shiryō 思想のための挑発的資料), was an experimental, small-press Japanese photography magazine founded in 1968 by critic/photographers Kōji Taki and Takuma Nakahira, photographer Yutaka Takanashi, and writer Takahiko Okada. Daidō Moriyama joined from the second issue. Provoke was "a platform for a new photographic expression", "to free photography from subservience to the language of words", "that stood in opposition to the photography establishment". It was a quarterly magazine that also included poetry, criticism and photographic theory. Provoke lasted for only three issues but has been described as having a "profound effect upon Japanese photography in the 1970s and 80s", and is said to have "spread a completely new idea of photography in Japan".

== Details ==
Three issues of Provoke magazine were published on 1 November 1968, 10 March 1969, and 10 August 1969, each in an edition of 1,000 copies.

The Provoke manifesto declared that visual images cannot completely represent an idea as words can, yet photographs can provoke language and ideas, "resulting in a new language and in new meanings"; the photographer can capture what cannot be expressed in words, presenting photographs as "documents" for others to read, hence Provoke's "provocative materials for thought" subtitle.

On 31 March 1970, the collective published the book 4. Mazu tashikarashisa no sekai o suterō: Shashin to gengo no shisō (First Abandon the World of Pseudo-Certainty: Thoughts on Photography and Language), (Note: Also translated as 'First Abandon the World of Certainty'.) through Tabata Shoten. A review of the group's activity, it is regarded as the Provoke No. 4 that is mentioned in No. 3. It contains photographs by Moriyama, Nakahira, Takanashi and Taki and text by Michie Amano, Nakahira, Okada and Taki.

All three issues of Provoke appeared in The Open Book, a traveling exhibition that tracked "the history of the photographic medium in the twentieth century through printed images in book form".

Work from Provoke was shown in the 2016/2017 touring exhibition Provoke: Between Protest and Performance – Photography in Japan 1960/1975 at Albertina in Vienna, Fotomuseum Winterthur in Switzerland, Le Bal in Paris and the Art Institute of Chicago.

Critic Gerry Badger has written that the "legendary Japanese magazine, Provoke, lasted for only three issues, but had a profound effect upon Japanese photography in the 1970s and 80s".

== History ==
According to historian Nick Kapur, the early 1960s saw political struggle in Japan reach its high point because of the United States-Japan Security Treaty (ANPO for short in Japanese) was due for revision. The treaty would allow the US (which had occupied Japan between 1945 and 1952) to perpetually maintain military bases in Japan, and was protested by many social groups, including the student union organization Zengakuren, from 1959 to 1960. In one protest in Tokyo in 1960, a female student protestor was killed. Meanwhile, the conservative government of Prime Minister Nobusuke Kishi, himself a rehabilitated war criminal, was eager to push through the ANPO treaty and also to revise Japan's pacifist constitution. This was perceived by many protestors as a way to assist the US in using Japan as a staging ground for imperialist wars against Japan's Asian neighbors, such as the Korean War and the escalating Vietnam War. A majority of the left wing within Japan opposed the ANPO treaty as a symbol of the US military influence on the Japanese political landscape.

Despite the protests, ANPO treaty was passed in 1960. Although Kishi himself had to resign from power in the face of protests, his party, the Liberal Democratic Party, continued to maintain nearly unbroken power between the late 1950s and the present. The unpopularity of ANPO and the Liberal Democratic Party stretched across generations and ideologies, but it was especially evident in universities, where young people during the 1960s were becoming more and more disillusioned with the political situation.

Beginning in the postwar period, the Japan Communist Party had become popular for giving voice to socialist and anti-imperialist aspirations, and the party thrived at a grassroots level, especially among students, despite being harshly suppressed by the conservative government of Japan. The Japan Communist Party never held power in the National Diet, but members of the Communist party were, by the 1960s, serving as leaders in many of the upper positions in student arts organizations, pushing for artists to create work that promoted socialist revolution and ideals. However, this sometimes led to tension among students, as there were at the time relatively few university venues dedicated to showcasing art, and the new generation of students since 1960 was becoming increasingly critical of the Japan Communist Party. Many criticized the party (which was known for its moderate, pro-democratic stances) for being insufficiently leftist, forming more militant organizations, and others sought new ways to express dissent outside a party framework.

Due to what was seen as rigid standards for art imposed by some communist student-run organizations, some Japanese artists had also become frustrated at what they perceived as a lack of space for artistic expression. Coupled with the Japanese economic boom during the 1950s to 1970s, which made it easier for some artists to make a living from their art alone, this situation led to a new independent movement in the arts.

Along with the political turmoil, the 1960s saw the expansion of a number of artistic movements. Provoke was part of the photographic movement that arose out of the late 1960s and was motivated by the opposition artists had felt towards the traditional powers of Japan. Now with increased political awareness, artists looked at the societal changes that had occurred during a period of strong economic growth. As a result of the political unrest, the Japanese government reacted by boosting public campaigns to spread their ideologies, mainly through the promise of a brighter future by encouraging increased consumption habits. Taki saw the potential for a new form of documentary photography that could inform his anti-government message and bring about changes in the cultural landscape.

During the early 1960s, Shōmei Tōmatsu was considered by many art critics as the leading photographer in Japan. He was a member of the photography agency VIVO, largely modeled after the prestigious European collective Magnum Photos. Tōmatsu became a mentor to a new generation of up-and-coming photographers, which included Kōji Taki, Takuma Nakahira, and Daidō Moriyama. It was during the preparations for the "Shashin 100-nen" (A Century of Japanese Photography) exhibition, where Taki was able to oversee the selection of hundreds of works by Japanese photographers. It was also during this time where Taki felt that the dominant ideologies of the government had begun influencing the artistic choices made by Japanese photographers. He felt that the "neutrality of art" was being threatened, thus creating the Provoke collective.

== Purpose ==
Members of Provoke aimed to change the traditional conceptions of Japanese photography. In particular, they proposed a new direction for documentary photography that was sharply different from their predecessors. During the time of the Vietnam War, the works of Magnum photographers began circulating through the mass media, as well as other highly publicized galleries. Magnum's work depicted the carnage of the Vietnam war, embracing a "realism" approach to documentary photography. Members of Provoke saw these photographs as appealing to universal humanity during the Cold War era. As a result, they sought to focus on a more personal and affective style, as opposed to the style of realism that was adopted by Magnum photographers. In his book, Kotoba no nai Shiko (Wordless Thought: Notes on Things, Space and Image), Taki wrote that it was an "attempt to dismantle the semantic environment" with the purpose "of trying to change reality".

The first issue, Provoke Manifesto, was the first realization of the collective's philosophy. They wished to depict reality as they saw it, if "only a fragment". Photography was a medium able to transcend language and thought. The main focus was to convey atmosphere and energy.

Today when words have lost their material base – in other words, their reality – and seem suspended in mid-air, a photographer's eye can capture fragments of reality that cannot be expressed in language as it is. He can submit those images as documents to be considered alongside language and ideology. This is why, brash as it may seem, Provoke has the subtitle ‘provocative documents of thought’.

== Style ==
Unlike many of their contemporaries, Provoke decided to focus on the monotony of urban life by choosing architecture, disenfranchised citizens, and abandoned sites as their subjects. This was in keeping with their ideals of rejecting the "traditional photographic subject". They sought to directly counter the "clean" and "functional" city that the state continued to promote during this period of economic growth.

Provoke's photos were characterized through a distinctive style that was often blurry, dark and out of focus. This visual style has been said to be, in Japanese, are-bure-boke, translated as 'grainy/rough, blurry, out-of-focus', a style already found in mainstream magazines such as Asahi Camera and Camera Mainichi. Photographic effects such as distortion, prominent grain and high contrast images were embraced by the group. They also often used images that other photographers would discard. These effects were a result of their experimentation with the development process of film photography, including altering manufacturers' recommendations for exposure times, correct temperature for the development process, and the printing process.

Seeing its immediacy to the readers as a merit, Provoke chose to place a heavy emphasis on the medium of paper. The imperfections of the printing process, such as the loss of detail in prints, were also embraced by Provoke photographers. They frequently utilized a printing technique known as halftone, which would dramatically increase the contrast and grain of an image. The group also chose to print their publications using a square format, leaving no margins at the edges of the paper. These aggressive techniques made it seem as if the photos seemingly bled into each other.

Nakahira and Moriyama had been experimenting with are-bure-boke before their involvement in Provoke, and Moriyama's 12-part conceptual project "Akushidento" (Accident) for Asahi Camera in 1969 took the approach in new directions. There were other comparable radical magazines and groups at the time including Geribara 5, which published three books. Asahi Journal, Kikan shashin eizō (The Photo Image) and Design also served as platforms for avant garde photography in the 'are-bure-boke' style by Nakahira, Moriyama and others.

== Disbandment ==
Towards the end of the publication, doubts began to arise among members whether the magazine achieved its original purpose. While Taki remained faithful to the initial vision of the magazine, Nakahira was beginning to question whether the abstraction of their methods was having concrete effects on the external world. As a result, Nakahira left the group to pursue work that was more direct and measurable in external influence. Nakahira would then publish an essay titled Naze shokubutsu zukan ka? (Why an illustrated botanical dictionary?), describing his previous efforts with Provoke as not neutral enough.

The individual works of Moriyama and Taki that came afterwards still followed much of original style and purpose of Provoke. Along with other contemporaries, these photographers would go on to be known as the "Era of Provoke". Subsequent works by members of Provoke arguably are continuations of the ideologies that the magazine sought to spread. Works included Nakahira's Kitarubeki kotoba no tame ni (For a Language to Come), Moriyama's Shashin yo sayōnara (Bye Bye Photography), and Takashi's Toshi-e (Towards a City).

== Academic research ==
An early academic investigation into Provoke is Chapter 3 of Fabienne Adler's 2009 Ph.D. thesis "First, Abandon the World of Seeming Certainty: Theory and Practice of the 'Camera-Generated Image' in Nineteen-Sixties Japan" (Stanford University). In 2010 a journal article on Daidō Moriyama put his photographic experimentation of the late 1960s and early 1970s in the context of his contributions to Provoke. Yuko Fujii's 2012 Ph.D. thesis on Provoke was entitled "Photography As Process: A Study of the Japanese Photography Journal Provoke" (City University of New York). Matthew Witkovsky's chapter "Provoke: Photography Up For Discussion" in the 2016 exhibition catalogue Provoke: Between Protest and Performance contains new research. An article from 2016 by Gyewon Kim proposes that Provoke used paper as a metaphor for the city, thereby critiquing the Japanese state's imposition of homogeneous urban planning and design. A lengthy 2017 article in the journal History of Photography by Philip Charrier argues that Provoke was highly theoretical in orientation. It shows that under the leadership of Taki and Nakahira, and inspired by the early writings on photography by Roland Barthes, the collective set out to create photographic imagery that could escape language and code.

== Issues ==
- Provoke 1: Shisō no tame no chōhatsuteki shiryō = Provoke 1: Provocative Resources for Thought. Tokyo: Purovōku-sha, 1968. With photographs by Nakahira, Takanashi and Taki and text by Okada and Taki. Edition of 1,000 copies.
- Provoke 2: Shisō no tame no chōhatsuteki shiryō = Provoke 2: Provocative Resources for Thought. Tokyo: Purovōku-sha, 1969. The theme was Eros. With photographs by Moriyama, Nakahira, Takanashi and Taki and text by Okada. Edition of 1,000 copies.
- Provoke 3: Shisō no tame no chōhatsuteki shiryō = Provoke 3: Provocative Resources for Thought. Tokyo: Purovōku-sha, 1969. With photographs by Moriyama, Nakahira, Takanashi, and Taki and text by Okada and Gōzō Yoshimasu. Edition of 1,000 copies.

== Publications reproducing Provoke material ==
The Japanese Box: Facsimile Reprint of Six Rare Photographic Publications of the Provoke Era, published in 2001 by Edition 7L (Paris) and Steidl (Göttingen), (Note: ISBN 3-88243-301-9.) contains facsimiles of the three issues of Provoke (as well as Nakahira's For a Language to Come, Moriyama's Farewell Photography and Nobuyoshi Araki's Sentimental Journey) and a newly edited booklet of explanatory material in English. The Box (an actual wooden box) was made in an edition of 1500. It does not include texts by Takahiko Okada.

A catalog for the similarly named exhibition, Provoke: Between Protest and Performance, was published in 2016 by Steidl. (Note: ISBN 978-3-95829-100-3. Edited by Diane Dufour, Matthew S. Witkovsky, and Duncan Forbes.) It contains photographs from Provoke and from other photographers including Shōmei Tōmatsu and Araki, as well as texts both from that period and newly written.

Provoke: Complete Reprint of 3 Volumes was published in 2018 by Nitesha. It is a reprint of the three volumes of Provoke, including all images and all original texts (including those by Takahiko Okada) in Japanese. It also includes a supplemental volume with English and Chinese translations of the original Japanese texts.

== Publications about Provoke ==
- Provoke. Tokyo: Seikyusha, 1996. Mostly text, in Japanese, with some photographs.
- Diane Dufour, Matthew S. Witkovsky (eds.). Provoke – Between Protest and Performance – Photography in Japan 1960 / 1975. Göttingen: Steidl, 2016. ISBN 978-3-95829-100-3.
- Ryūichi Kaneko, Toda Masako, Ivan Vartanian. Japanese Photography Magazines, 1880s to 1980s. Tokyo: Goliga, 2024.
