= Takahiro Iwasaki =

Japanese artist and sculptor (born 1975)

Takahiro Iwasaki (岩崎 貴宏, Iwasaki Takahiro; born 1975 in Hiroshima) is a Japanese artist and sculptor. He has exhibited in international settings including the Seoul Museum of Art in South Korea, the Moscow Museum of Modern Art in Russia, the Queensland Art Gallery in Australia, and the Palais de Tokyo in Paris, France.

== Life and works ==
Takahiro Iwasaki was born and raised in Hiroshima, where he studied at the Hiroshima City University. He earned a Bachelor of Arts in Arts in 1998, a Master of Arts in 2001 and a Doctor of Philosophy in 2003. In 2005 he received a Master of Fine Arts from the Edinburgh College of Art. His most well-known series of works is Out of Disorder, which reproduces architectural structures from rendered unusual materials such as hair, dust, threads, towels, and toothbrushes. Subjects include the Wonder Wheel in Coney Island, the Cosmoworld in Yokohama, and also shipyards and oil refineries. The series also includes topographical maps sculpted on rolls of duct tape, including a reproduction of the Victoria Peak in Hong Kong. It was exhibited at the Cornerhouse gallery in Manchester, United Kingdom in 2011, at the Asian Art Biennial in the National Taiwan Museum of Fine Arts in 2013, and at the Kawasaki City Museum in 2014, among others.

Another series of works by Iwasaki includes temples sculpted in Japanese cypress, where an inverted version is attached underneath as if it were a reflection on water, and the whole sculpture is suspended in mid-air. His first work of this kind, Reflection Model, was exhibited at the Gallery Natsuka in Tokyo in 2001. Iwasaki completed a new and more complex model, faithfully representing the Byōdō-in near Kyoto, in 2012, and exhibited it at the Asia Pacific Triennial of Contemporary Art organized by the Queensland Art Gallery in Queensland, Australia. In September of the same year Iwasaki put several microscopic sculptures, including an incomplete Eiffel Tower, in the exhibition space at the Palais de Tokyo in Paris, France. The works could be magnified using a telescope. In 2014 Iwasaki created two site-specific works at the Museum of Modern and Contemporary Art of Trento and Rovereto, in Italy, representing the cupola of the museum and a tower made of hair and dust, again magnified through telescopes.

== Solo exhibitions ==
- Turned Upside Down, It's a Forest, Venice Biennial 2017, Venice, Italy (2017)
- Out of Disorder, Kawasaki City Museum, Kanagawa, Japan (2014)
- Glance, Object, Symbol, Palais de Tokyo, Paris, France (2012)
- Metaphrase Scenery, Arataniurano, Tokyo, Japan (2012)
- Out of Disorder (White Mountains), 3331 Arts Chiyoda, Tokyo, Japan (2011)
- Nichtlokalität, Nassauischer Kunstverein, Wiesbaden, Germany (2011)
- Phenotypic Remodeling, Arataniurano, Tokyo, Japan (2010)
- Structural Phase Transition Model, Art Basel, Switzerland (2010)
- Out of Disorder, Cairn Gallery, Fife, Scotland (2006)
- Differential / Integral Calculus, Sleeper, Edinburgh, Scotland (2005)
- Process to Model, Formative Space Laboratory, Hiroshima, Japan (2003)
- Reflection Model, Gallery Natsuka, Tokyo, Japan (2001)
- Mental Picture, Studio Sako, Hiroshima, Japan (1998)
