= Seikyūsha =

Japanese book publisher

Seikyūsha (青弓社) is a publisher based in Chiyoda, Tokyo, Japan. Philosophy, ideology, religion, mysticism, sexuality, and subculture are the main themes covered by the books it publishes. There is also a large number of publications related to Takarazuka Revue. In 2000, it published a new translation of Les Structures élémentaires de la parenté (1949, English: "The Elementary Structures of Kinship", Japanese:「親族の基本構造) by Claude Lévi-Strauss.
