= Toshinobu Onosato =

Japanese printmaker

Toshinobu Onosato (June 8, 1912 – November 30, 1986) was a Japanese printmaker. His work frequently included geometric shapes like circles, rectangles, and triangles, leading to his reputation as a pioneer of scientifically oriented design.

== Biography ==
Onosato was born on June 8, 1912, in Iida, Nagano. His family moved to Kiryu, Gunma when he was a child. He studied Western-style painting under Seifū Tsuda. In 1935 he had his first exhibition, which was with the Nika Association. The same year he formed a group called "Kokusho" with three other artists who studied under Tsuda. In 1937, he helped to found the Free Artists Association (Jiyu Bijutsuka Kyokai).

During World War II, Onosato conscripted to the Japanese Army and was sent to Manchuria. He was captured and interned in Siberia for three years. He returned to Japan in 1948. He married Tomoko Onosato in 1951.

While he started out as an oil painter, Onosato later branched out to printmaking in the 1950s. He made both silk screen prints and lithographs. He decided to quit the Free Artists Association in 1956, and worked as an independent artist from that point on. In 1963, one of his works was exhibited at the 7th International Japanese Exhibition, and he took first place. He was awarded a Guggenheim Fellowship in 1964. In 1964 and 1966 Onosato was one of the artists that represented Japan at the Venice Biennale.

Onosato died of pneumonia on November 30, 1986. The Onosato Museum of Art was built in 1992 and named in his honor.

== Style ==
Onosato works with geometric forms, usually circles. From afar, the shapes seem exact, but up close there are clear imperfections. He is considered a pioneer of scientifically oriented design. The patterns create a path for the viewer's eye to follow, and his use of color works as another guide.

Museums that hold Onosato's work include the Metropolitan Museum of Art, and the Los Angeles County Museum of Art.
