= Getsuyosha =

Tokyo-based publishing company

Getsuyosha Limited
- Native name: 有限会社月曜社
- Romanized name: Yugen Kaisha Getsuyōsha
- Company type: Yugen kaisha

Getsuyosha Limited (有限会社月曜社, Yugen Kaisha Getsuyōsha) is a Tokyo-based publishing company. Getsuyosha was started on 7 December 2000, and mainly publishes books on philosophy, cultural studies, and fine arts.
