= Kōji Taki =

- 多木浩二(たきこうじ)
- Born: December 27, 1928; Kobe
- Died: April 13, 2011 (aged 82); Hiratsuka, Kanagawa
- Education: graduated of the art history program in the faculty of letters at the University of Tokyo.; Professor of Tokyo Zokei University.; Professor of Chiba University.; Visiting Professor of Kobe Art University of Technology (University of Hyogo)
- Occupation: Coeditor of Provoke (magazine)

Kōji Taki (Japanese: 多木 浩二, Hepburn: Taki Kōji; 27 December 1928 – 13 April 2011) was a Japanese critic, photographer and philosopher.

== Life and career ==
Taki graduated with a degree in art history from Tokyo University.

Taki began his professional career as a core figure at the Japanese photography magazine Provoke, which he co-founded and where he worked from 1968 to 1970. He also provided most of the funds for the magazine. However, because of his "aloofness" and greater focus on writing, he was best known as a critical writer rather than a visual artist. He also wrote frequently on philosophy, politics and history.

Taki died at the age of 82 on Apr 13 in Hiratsuka, Kanagawa.

=== PROVOKE ===
The magazine was founded by Taki and poet Takahiko Okada, and photographers Takuma Nakahira and Yutaka Takanashi, as an attempt to fill the gap between politics and art, and as a result of frustration at the post-war world. Published between 1968 and 1969, only about 1,000 copies were originally printed, although various reprints are available today. The images in the magazine pioneered a new grainy or blurry style that contrasted with the Japanese aesthetic at the time and the magazine was strongly criticised. The magazine also had a strong focus on critical writing.

== Books ==
Taki's most revered books include Ikareta Ie (Lived-in Houses), published by Tabata Shoten in 1976; Tenno no Shozo (The Emperor's Portrait), published by Iwanami Shoten in 1988; and Senso-Ron (The Theory of War), published by Iwanami Shoten in 1999.

Other notable books include the following:

- Abandoned in the third issue of Provoke (magazine) in 1969, compiled in the book 『まずたしからしさの世界を捨てろ』 (First abandon the world of exceptional experiences), 1970, Tabata Shoten
- As a critic by the critic 『ことばのない思考』 (Words without words), 1972, Tabata Shoten, which compares the experiences of the rapid transformation of thought and expression by themselves and comprehensively discusses photographs, architecture, space, furniture, books and images.
- 『生きられた家』 (Living houses), 1976, Tabata Shoten / 2001, Iwanami Hyodo Bunko, studied the complex relation of human life and living space making full use of phenomenology and semiotics.
- 『眼の隠喩』 (Metaphor of Eyes), in 1982, Aosaka Co., Ltd., in 2008, Aichi Gakuin Bunko started full-scale historical philosophical work to understand the art and culture by establishing the concept of gaze. This series of thinking, combined with body theory and political aesthetic consideration
- 『欲望の修辞学』 (Rhetoric of desire), 1987
- 『もし世界の声が聴こえたら』 (If the voice of the world can be heard), 2002.
- 『死の鏡』 (Mirror of death), 2004.
- 『進歩とカタストロフィ』 (Progress and Catastrophe), 2005, Aozora Corporation.

== Poetry ==
- 『「もの」の詩学』 (things) 『神話なき世界の芸術家』 (artists without mythology), 1994.

== Modern psychic history ==
- 『シジフォスの笑い』 (Laughter of Sygiphos) 1997, over Iwanami Shoten.
- 『天皇の肖像』 (Portrait of the Emperor), 1988, Iwanami Shoten analyzed the modern psychic history of Japan and Western Europe vividly in an iconographic way 1998–2003, Shinkansha.
- Captain Cook trilogy 『船がゆく』 (Ship goes), 『船とともに』 (With ship), 『最後の航海』 (Last voyage)

== From the mid-1990s ==
- Where he discussed the philosophical meanings of various phenomena in books
- 『ヌード写真』 (Nude Photography).
- 『都市の政治学』 (Political Science of the city).
- 『肖像写真』 (Portrait Photography), Iwanami Shoten.
- 『スポーツを考える: 身体・資本・ナショナリズム』 (Thinking of sports: The Body, Capital and Nationalism), 1995 Tokyo: Chikuma Shobo.

== Small books ==
- 『表象の多面体』 (Polyhedron of Representation), 2009, Aosaga) who discussed four contemporary artists who adore love last.
- 『トリノ 夢とカタストロフィーの彼方へ』 (Turin dreams and catastrophes to the other side) 2012, BEARLIN.
- 『視線とテクスト』 (Eyes and texts), 2013, Aosaka.
- 『映像の歴史哲学』 (historical philosophy of images), 2013, Misuzu Shobo, published posthumously.

== Projects ==
- editing the publication Nihon shashin shi 1840-1945 (A History of Japanese Photography: 1840–1945, Heibonsha, 1971.
- contributing to the architecture periodical 10+1.
