= Ikkō Narahara =

Japanese photographer (1931–2020)

Ikkō Narahara (Note: Sometimes "Ikko Narahara" or simply "Ikko".) (奈良原 一高, Narahara Ikkō; November 3, 1931 – January 19, 2020) was a Japanese photographer. His work is held in the collection of the Museum of Modern Art in New York.

== Early life and education ==
Born in Fukuoka, Narahara studied law at Chuo University (graduating in 1954) and, influenced by statues of Buddha at Nara, art history at the graduate school of Waseda University, from which he received an MA in 1959.

== Career ==
He had his first solo exhibition, Ningen no tochi (Human land), at the Matsushima Gallery (Ginza) in 1956. In this Narahara showed Kurokamimura, a village on Sakurajima. The exhibition brought instant renown.

In the same year, Narahara was also included in the First International Subjective Photography Exhibition, an event associated with the newly founded Japan Subjective Photography League that briefly brought emerging photographers such as Kiyoji Ōtsuji and Yasuhiro Ishimoto into the same postwar framework as prewar avant-garde figures including Kansuke Yamamoto.

Narahara had shown his works in the first (1957) of three exhibitions titled The Eyes of Ten; exhibited in all three, and went on to co-found the short-lived Vivo collective.

In his second solo exhibition, "Domains", at the Fuji Photo Salon in 1958, he showed a Trappist monastery in Tobetsu (Hokkaidō), and a women's prison in Wakayama.

From 1962 to 1965 he stayed in Paris, and after a time in Tokyo, from 1970 to 1974 in New York City. During this time he took part in a class by the American photographer Diane Arbus. He recorded Arbus' speech during these classes. These recordings would become an interesting document of the artist's statements about her own work shortly before she committed suicide.

Narahara's work often depicted isolated communities and extreme conditions. He made much use of wide-angle lenses, even hemispherical-coverage ("circular") fisheye lenses.

In 1967 Narahara won the Photographer of the Year Award from the Japan Photo Critics Association. He won numerous other prizes. From 1999 to 2005, Narahara was a professor at the Graduate School of Kyushu Sangyo University (Fukuoka).

== Works by Narahara ==
=== Booklength collections ===
- Yōroppa: seishi shita jikan (ヨーロッパ・静止した時間, Where time has stopped). Kajima, 1967.
- Supēn: Idai naru gogo (スペーン・偉大なる午後) España: Grand tarde, Fiesta, Vaya con Dios. Tokyo: Kyūryūdō, 1969.
- Japanesuku (ジャパネスク, Japanesque). Tokyo: Mainichi Shinbun-sha, 1970.
- Ōkoku (王国) / Man and his land. Tokyo: Chūōkoronsha, 1971.
- Shōmetsu shita jikan (消滅した時間) / Where time has vanished. Tokyo: Asahi Shinbun-sha, 1975.
- Seven From Ikko. Tokyo : Unac, 1976.
- Ōkoku: Chinmoku no sono, kabe no naka (王国：沈黙の園・壁の中). Tokyo: Asahi Sonorama, 1978.
- Chikakute haruka na tabi (近くて遥かな旅). Tokyo: Shūeisha, 1979.
- Hikari no kairō: San Maruko (光の回廊：サン・マルコ, Arcade of light: Piazza San Marco). Tokyo: Unac, 1981.
- Shashin no jikan (写真の時間). Tokyo: Kōsakusha, 1981. With Seigow Matsuoka (松岡正剛).
- Narahara Ikkō (奈良原一高, Ikkō Narahara). Shōwa shashin zenshigoto 9. Tokyo: Asahi Shinbun-sha, 1983.
- Venetsia no yoru (ヴェネツィアの夜) / Venice: Nightscapes. Tokyo: Iwanami, 1985. ISBN 4-00-008027-X. Most of the text is in Japanese only, but the captions and an essay by Narahara are in English as well as Japanese.
- Shōzō no fūkei (肖像の風景). Tokyo: Shinchōsha, 1985. ISBN 4-10-357501-8.
- Ningen no tochi (人間の土地), Human land. Tokyo: Libroport, 1987.
  - Fukkan, 2017.
- Hoshi no kioku (星の記憶, The memory of stars). Tokyo: Parco, 1987.
- Venetsia no hikari (ヴェネツィアの光) / Venetian Light. Tokyo: Ryūkō Tsūshin, 1985. ISBN 4-947551-93-3.
- Burōdowei (ブロードウェイ) / Broadway. Tokyo: Creo, 1991. ISBN 4-906371-05-1.
- Dyushan dai-garasu to Takiguchi Shūzō shigā bokkusu (デュシャン大ガラスと瀧口修造シガー・ボックス) / Marcel Duchamp large glass with Shuzo Takiguchi cigar box. Tokyo: Misuzu, 1992. ISBN 4-622-04242-8.
- Kū (空) / Emptiness. Tokyo: Libroport, 1994. ISBN 4-8457-0898-1.
- Takemitsu, Tōru and Giovanni Chiaramonte. Ikko Narahara: Japanesque. Milan: Motta, 1994. ISBN 88-7179-087-1. In Italian
- Revised and augmented edition: Tokyo: Creo, 1995. ISBN 4-906371-20-5
- Tokyo, the '50s. Tokyo: Mole, 1996. ISBN 4-938628-21-X.
- Narahara Ikkō (奈良原一高, Ikkō Narahara). Tokyo: Iwanami, 1997.
- Poketto Tōkyō (ポケット東京) / Pocket Tokyo. Tokyo: Creo, 1997. ISBN 4-87736-010-7.
- Ten (天) / Heaven. Tokyo: Creo, 2002. ISBN 4-87736-078-6
- Mukokuseki-chi (無国籍地) / Stateless Land: 1954. Tokyo: Creo, 2004. ISBN 4-87736-097-2.
- Jikū no kagami (時空の鏡) / Mirror of space and time. Tokyo: Shinchōsha, 2004. ISBN 4-10-357502-6.
- En (円) / En: Circular vision. Tokyo: Creo, 2004. ISBN 4-87736-102-2.

=== Other books with work by Narahara ===
- Hiraki, Osamu, and Keiichi Takeuchi. Japan, a Self-Portrait: Photographs 1945–1964. Paris: Flammarion, 2004. ISBN 2-08-030463-1 Also presents work by Ken Domon, Hiroshi Hamaya, Tadahiko Hayashi, Eikō Hosoe, Yasuhiro Ishimoto, Kikuji Kawada, Ihei Kimura, Shigeichi Nagano, Takeyoshi Tanuma, and Shōmei Tōmatsu.
- (in Japanese) Nihon nūdo meisakushū (日本ヌード名作集, Japanese nudes). Camera Mainichi bessatsu. Tokyo: Mainichi Shinbunsha, 1982. Pp. 194–99 show nudes by Narahara.
- Nihon shashin no tenkan: 1960 nendai no hyōgen (日本写真の転換：1960時代の表現) / Innovation in Japanese Photography in the 1960s. Tokyo: Tokyo Metropolitan Museum of Photography, 1991. Exhibition catalogue, text in Japanese and English. Pp. 18–29 show a selection of Narahara's earlier work. (That on p. 23 is upside down, as pointed out in an erratum slip.)
- Shashin toshi Tōkyō (写真都市Tokyo) / Tokyo/City of Photos. Tokyo: Tokyo Metropolitan Museum of Photography, 1995. Catalogue of an exhibition held in 1995. Also presents work by Takanobu Hayashi, Hiroh Kikai, Ryūji Miyamoto, Daidō Moriyama, Shigeichi Nagano, Mitsugu Ōnishi, Masato Seto, Issei Suda, Akihide Tamura, Tokuko Ushioda, and Hiroshi Yamazaki. Captions and texts in both Japanese and English.
- Yamagishi, Shoji, ed. Japan, a self-portrait. New York: International Center of Photography, 1979. ISBN 0-933642-01-6 (hard), ISBN 0-933642-02-4 paper). Also presents works by Ryōji Akiyama, Nobuyoshi Araki, Taiji Arita, Masahisa Fukase, Hiroshi Hamaya, Shinzō Hanabusa, Miyako Ishiuchi, Kikuji Kawada, Jun Morinaga, Daidō Moriyama, Kishin Shinoyama, Issei Suda, Shōmei Tōmatsu, Haruo Tomiyama, Hiromi Tsuchida, Shōji Ueda, Gashō Yamamura, and Hiroshi Yamazaki.
- Yamagishi, Shoji, and John Szarkowski, eds. New Japanese photography. New York: Museum of Modern Art, 1974. ISBN 0-87070-503-2 (hard), ISBN 0-87070-503-2 (paper). Also presents work by Ryōji Akiyama, Ken Domon, Eikō Hosoe, Masahisa Fukase, Tetsuya Ichimura, Yasuhiro Ishimoto, Bishin Jūmonji, Kikuji Kawada, Daidō Moriyama, Masatoshi Naitō, Ken Ohara, Akihide Tamura (as Shigeru Tamura), Shōmei Tōmatsu, and Hiromi Tsuchida.

== Collections ==
- Museum of Modern Art, New York: 11 prints (as of January 2020)
- Museum of Fine Arts Houston

== General sources ==
- Tucker, Anne Wilkes, et al. The History of Japanese Photography. New Haven: Yale University Press, 2003. ISBN 0-300-09925-8.
