= Shōji Yamagishi =

Japanese photography critic, curator, and magazine editor

Shōji Yamagishi (山岸 章二, Yamagishi Shōji; 1930 – 20 July 1979) was a Japanese photography critic, curator, and magazine editor.

== Biography ==
Yamagishi entered Mainichi Shinbunsha (publisher of Mainichi Shinbun) in 1950. He started as a photographer.

From 1963 until its July 1978 issue, Yamagishi edited Camera Mainichi, and was widely admired both for the quality of the photography he was able to present there and for the encouragement he gave to young photographers. During this period advertising was attracting some of the most talented photographers, and Yamagishi was particularly noted for the way in which he persuaded photographers working in advertising to pursue their own photographic interests during their spare time. As an editor (and curator), Yamagishi had the knack of evaluating and selecting photographs much faster than his peers. Camera Mainichi was under much pressure from its publisher to make money, or at least not to lose money; the degree of pressure irked Yamagishi and was what caused him to resign.

Yamagishi worked with his friend John Szarkowski to mount two exhibitions of Japanese photography in New York. "New Japanese Photography" (Museum of Modern Art, 1974) presented works by Ryōji Akiyama, Ken Domon, Masahisa Fukase, Eikō Hosoe, Tetsuya Ichimura, Yasuhiro Ishimoto, Bishin Jūmonji, Kikuji Kawada, Daidō Moriyama, Masatoshi Naitō, Ikkō Narahara, Ken Ohara, Akihide Tamura (as Shigeru Tamura), Shōmei Tōmatsu, and Hiromi Tsuchida. "Japan, a Self-Portrait" (International Center of Photography, 1979) presented works by Ryōji Akiyama, Nobuyoshi Araki, Taiji Arita, Masahisa Fukase, Shinzō Hanabusa, Hiroshi Hamaya, Miyako Ishiuchi, Kikuji Kawada, Jun Morinaga, Daidō Moriyama, Ikkō Narahara, Kishin Shinoyama, Issei Suda, Shōmei Tōmatsu, Haruo Tomiyama, Hiromi Tsuchida, Shōji Ueda, Gashō Yamamura, and Hiroshi Yamazaki.

Yamagishi suffered from intermittent depression. This was exacerbated by the pressures of making the selections for a Magnum exhibition in Tokyo, prompting his suicide.

== Books edited by Yamagishi ==
- New Japanese photography (co-edited by John Szarkowski). New York: Museum of Modern Art, 1974. ISBN 0-87070-503-2 (hard), ISBN 0-87070-502-4 (paper)
- Japan, a self-portrait. New York: International Center of Photography, 1979. ISBN 0-933642-01-6 (hard), ISBN 0-933642-02-4 paper). (This should not be confused with the 2004 publication Japan, a self-portrait: Photographs 1945–1964, ed. Osamu Hiraki and Keiichi Takeuchi.)

== Links, sources, further reading ==
- Nihon shashinka jiten (日本写真家事典, 328 Outstanding Japanese Photographers). Kyoto: Tankōsha, 2000. ISBN 4-473-01750-8. (in Japanese)
- GJ Photobooks. Notes, on Shōji Yamagishi and Camera Mainichi among others.
- Short entry at PhotoGuide Japan
- Nishii Kazuo (西井一夫). Shashin-henshūsha: Yamagishi Shōji e no omāju (写真編集者 山岸章二へのオマージュ, Photo editor: A homage to Shōji Yamagishi). Tokyo: Mado-sha, 2002. ISBN 4-89625-038-9. (in Japanese)
