= Hiroh Kikai =

Japanese photographer (1945–2020)

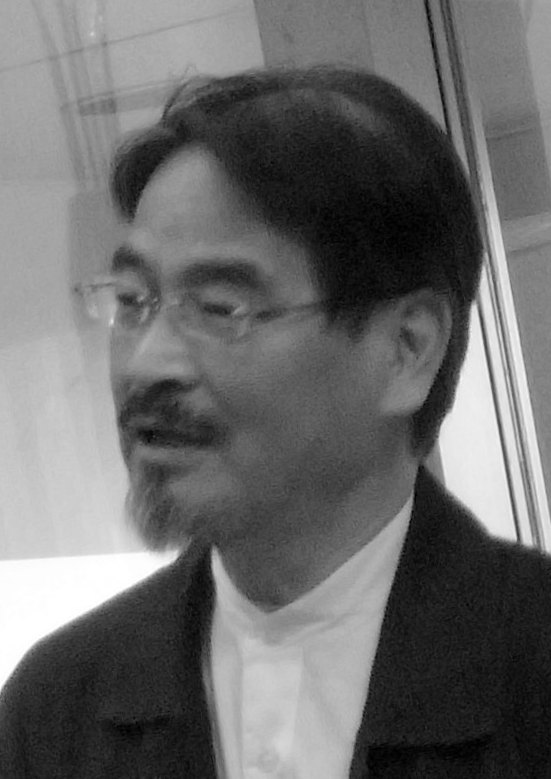
Hiroh Kikai, in 2011

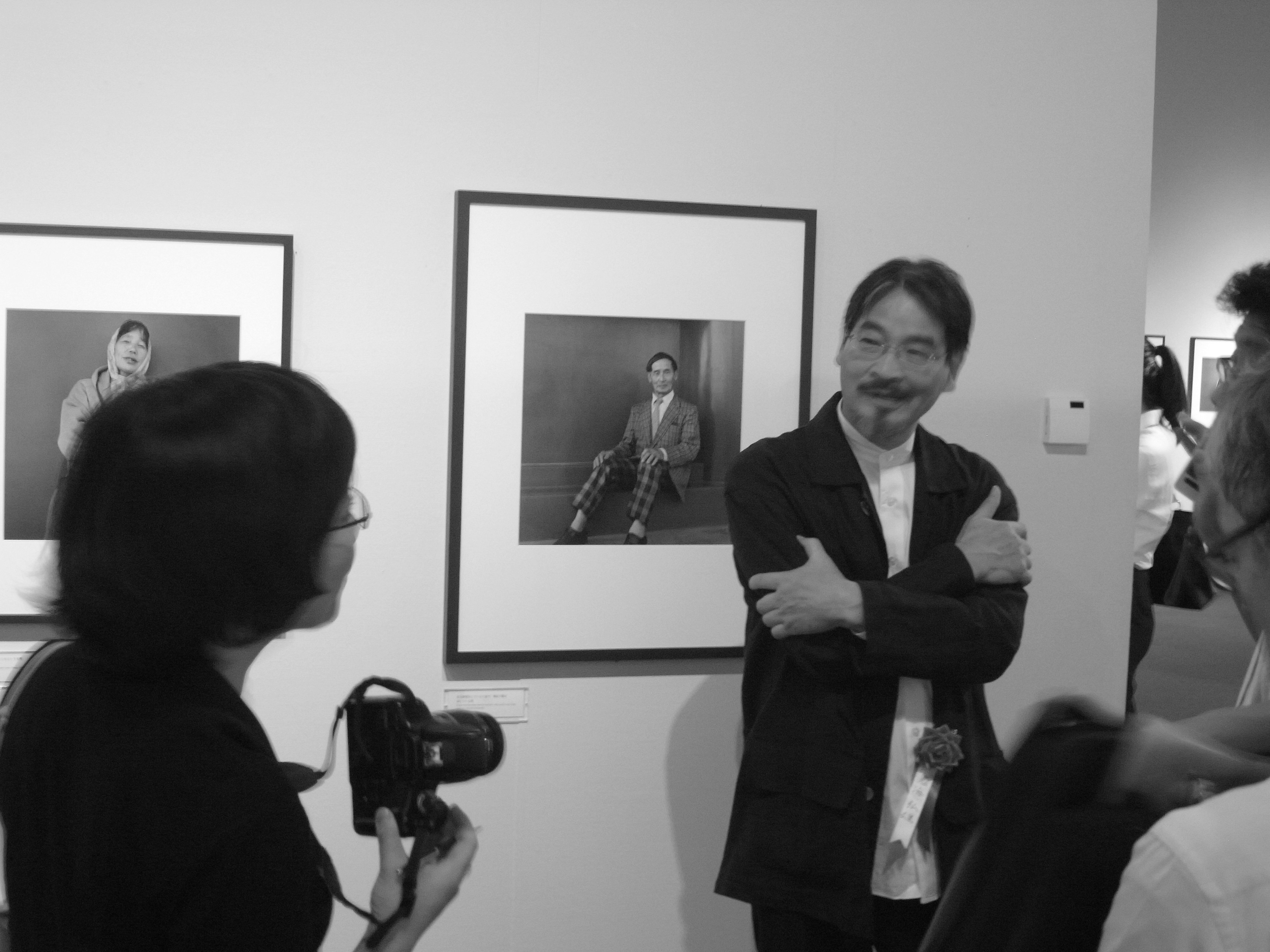
Kikai interviewed during the press preview of his exhibition Tokyo Portraits at the Tokyo Metropolitan Museum of Photography, 12 August 2011

Hiroh Kikai (鬼海 弘雄, Kikai Hiroo (Note: When romanized, the name is usually spelled "Hiroh" but sometimes "Hiroo"; in French contexts, sometimes "Hirô".); 18 March 1945 – 19 October 2020) was a Japanese photographer best known within Japan for four series of monochrome photographs: scenes of buildings in and close to Tokyo, portraits of people in the Asakusa area of Tokyo, and rural and town life in India and Turkey. He pursued each of these for over two decades, and each led to one or more book-length collections.

Although previously a respected name in Japanese photography, Kikai was not widely known until 2004, when the first edition of his book Persona, a collection of Asakusa portraits, won both the Domon Ken Award and Annual Award of the PSJ. In 2009, the ICP and Steidl copublished Asakusa Portraits for an international market.

== Early years ==
Kikai was born in the village of Daigo (now part of Sagae, Yamagata Prefecture) on 18 March 1945 as the seventh and last child (and fifth son) of the family. He had a happy childhood, from the age of 11 or so preferring to play by himself in the nature that surrounded the village. He graduated from high school in 1963 and worked in Yamagata for a year, and then went to Hosei University in Tokyo to study philosophy. As a student he was keen on the cinema—he particularly enjoyed the films of Andrzej Wajda, who would later contribute essays to some of his books, and Satyajit Ray—and said that he would have worked in film production if it did not require writing, a task he never enjoyed, and money, which he lacked.

Immediately after his graduation in 1968, Kikai worked for two years as a truck driver and for two in a shipyard. Meanwhile, he stayed in touch with his philosophy professor from his university days, Sadayoshi Fukuda, whose interests extended to writing a regular column for the magazine Camera Mainichi; he introduced Kikai to its editor, Shōji Yamagishi, who showed him photographs by Diane Arbus that made a great impact on Kikai. Kikai started to take photographs in 1969. At that time (when somebody fresh out of university could expect to earn ¥40,000 per month), a Hasselblad SLR camera normally cost ¥600,000; Kikai heard of an opportunity to buy one for ¥320,000 and mentioned this to Fukuda, who immediately lent him the money, with no interest, and no date or pressure for repayment. (The loan was eventually repaid.) This Hasselblad 500CM, with its 80 mm lens, was what Kikai used for his portraits thereafter.

== Career ==
Kikai thought that work on a boat might be photogenic, but, having no experience, could not get a job on one. He was eventually accepted on a boat fishing for tuna when he displayed the scar from an unneeded appendectomy as evidence of one risk fewer that his presence might force the boat into port. He worked on the boat in the Pacific from 6 April until 9 November 1972, with a stop in Manzanillo (Mexico) for provisions. It was during this time that he took his first photographs to be published, in the May 1973 issue of Camera Mainichi. In 1973 he won a prize for his submission to the 14th exhibition of the Japan Advertising Photographers' Association. But Kikai decided that in order to be a photographer he needed darkroom skills, and he returned to Tokyo to work at Doi Technical Photo (1973–76). He became a freelance photographer in 1984, a year after his first solo exhibition and the same year as his second.

Living close to Asakusa (Tokyo), Kikai often went there on his days off, taking photographs of visitors. He stepped up his visits in 1985; a number of collections of his portraits taken there have been published.

Kikai's other long-term photographic projects are of working and residential neighborhoods in and near Tokyo, and of people and scenes in India and Turkey. All these are black and white. However, his occasional diversions included color photographs of the Gotō Islands and even of nudes.

Unusually in Japan, where photographers tend to join or form groups, Kikai was never in any group, preferring to work by himself. When not setting out to take photographs, Kikai did not carry a camera with him. He left photographing his own family to his wife Noriko, and it is she who had the camera if they went on a trip together.

In the early part of his career, Kikai often had to earn money in other ways: after three years' work in the darkroom, he returned to manual labor.

Kikai taught for some time at Musashino Art University, but he was disappointed by the students' lack of sustained effort and therefore quit.

Kikai died of lymphoma on 19 October 2020.

=== Asakusa portraits ===
Kikai had started his Asakusa series of square, monochrome portraits as early as 1973, but after this there was a hiatus until 1985, when he realized that an ideal backdrop would be the plain red walls of Sensō-ji. At that time, the great majority of his Asakusa portraits adopted further constraints: the single subject stands directly in front of the camera (originally a Minolta Autocord TLR, later the Hasselblad), looking directly at it, and is shown from around the knees upwards. Kikai might wait at the temple for four or five hours, hoping to see somebody he wanted to photograph, and three or four days might pass without a single photograph; but he might photograph three people in a single day, and he photographed over six hundred people in this way. He believed that to have a plain backdrop and a direct confrontation with the subject allows the viewer to see the subject as a whole, and as somebody on whom time is marked, without any distracting or limiting specificity.

Though Kikai started to photograph in Asakusa simply because it was near where he then lived, he continued because of the nature of the place and its visitors. Once a busy area, Asakusa has lost its appeal. If it were as popular and crowded as it was before the war, Kikai said, he would go somewhere else.

Published in 1987, Ōtachi no shōzō / Ecce Homo was the first collection of these portraits. It is a large-format book with portraits made in Asakusa in 1985 to '86. Kikai won the 1988 Newcomer's Award of the Photographic Society of Japan (PSJ) for this book and the third Ina Nobuo Award for the accompanying exhibition.

In 1995, a number of portraits from the series were shown together with the works of eleven other photographers in Tokyo/City of Photos, one of a pair of opening exhibitions for the purpose-made building of the Tokyo Metropolitan Museum of Photography.

Ya-Chimata, a second collection of the portraits made in Asakusa, was published a year later.

Persona (2003) is a further collection. A few are from Kikai's earliest work, but most postdate anything in the earlier books. Several of the subjects appear twice or more often, so the reader sees the effect of time. The book format is unusually large for a photograph collection in Japan, and the plates were printed via quadtone. The book won the 23rd Domon Ken Award and 2004 Annual Award of the PSJ. A smaller-format edition with additional photographs followed two years later.

Asakusa Portraits (2008) is a large collection edited by the International Center of Photography (New York), published in conjunction with the ICP's exhibition of recent Japanese photography and art Heavy Light. Kikai's contribution to this exhibition was well received, and Asakusa Portraits won praise for its photography and also (from Paul Smith) for the vernacular fashion of those photographed.

=== Portraits of spaces ===
Kikai said that people and scenery are two sides of the same coin. When tired of waiting (or photographing) in Asakusa, he would walk as far as 20 km looking for urban scenes of interest where he could make "portraits of spaces". A day's walk might take two or three hours for less than a single roll of 120 film. He generally photographed between 10 a.m. and 3 p.m., and avoided photographing when people were outside as their presence would transform the photographs into mere snapshots, easily understood; even without people, they are the images or reflections of life. Kikai might find a scene that he wanted to photograph and then wait there and only photograph it when something unexpected occurred in the frame. After development, he did not bother with contact prints, instead judging a photograph by the negative alone.

Samples from this series appeared in various magazines from at least as early as 1976. Each photograph is simply captioned with the approximate address (in Japanese script) and year.

Tōkyō meiro / Tokyo Labyrinth (1999) presents portraits of unpeopled spaces in Tokyo (and occasionally the adjacent town of Kawasaki). There are individual shopfronts, rows of shops and residential streets. Most of the buildings are unpretentious. Like the Asakusa series, these portraits are monochrome and square, taken via a standard lens on 120 film.

Tōkyō mutan / Labyrinthos (2007)—based on an essay/photograph series that ran in the monthly Sōshi (草思) from March 2004 to July 2005 and then in the web series "Tokyo Polka"—presents more of the same. Between a single nude in a shopfront display from 1978 and a very young boy photographed in December 2006 (the latter appearing to share the Sensō-ji backdrop of Persona), are square monochrome views of Tokyo and Kawasaki, compositions that seem casual and rather disorderly, mostly of unpeopled scenes showing signs of intensive and recent use. The book also has Kikai's essays from "Tokyo Polka", essays that dwell on the inhabitants of Tokyo as observed during walks or on the train.

Tokyo View (2016) is a large-format collection, mostly of photographs that also appear in one or other of the earlier books (or Tōkyō pōtoreito / Tokyo Portraits).

=== India ===
Kikai said that going to India felt like a return to the Yamagata of his youth, and a release from life in Tokyo. His photography there was much less planned or formal than his portraits of people or places in Tokyo: after an early start with color 120 film, he used black and white 35 mm film in India—and laughingly said that he would use 35 mm in Tokyo if the city were more interesting and did not make him feel unhappy.

India, a large-format book published in 1992, presents photographs taken in India (and to a much lesser extent Bangladesh) over a period totalling rather more than a year and ranging from 1982 to 1990. It won high praise from the critic Kazuo Nishii, who commented that the India of Kikai's work seems perpetually overcast, and that in their ambiguity his photographs seem to benefit from the work done in the Asakusa portrait series. The book won Kikai the 1993 Society of Photography Award.

Shiawase / Shanti (2001) is a collection of photographs that concentrates on children, most of which were taken in Allahabad, Benares, Calcutta, Puri and Delhi in 2000. It won the Grand Prix of the second Photo City Sagamihara Festival.

=== Turkey ===
Wanting to explore somewhere that (in contrast to India) was cold, as well as a Muslim land where Asian and European cultures meet, in 1994 Kikai made the first of six visits to Turkey, where he stayed for a total of nine months. His monochrome photographs of Turkey appeared in the magazine Asahi Camera, and his colour photographs on its website, before the publication in January 2011 of his large book Anatolia, a compilation of his monochrome work.

=== Photography elsewhere ===
Kikai was one of thirteen Japanese photographers invited by EU–Japan Fest to photograph the twenty-six nations of the European Union; he spent twenty-one days in Malta in September 2005 and a short period in Portugal in October 2004, travelling widely in both countries. In color, these photographs are a departure from his earlier work. Most are more or less candid photographs of people. The collection was published in a book titled In-between 8.

Series of color photographs from short visits to Cuba (2007) and Taiwan (2013) have appeared in Asahi Camera.

=== Writing ===
Kikai's essays have appeared in periodicals and within some of his own photobooks. They have also been collected in four books, in which they are illustrated by reproductions of relevant photographs.

Indo ya Gassan ("India and Gassan", 1999) is a collection of essays about and photographs of India. Gassan is a mountain in central Yamagata close to where Kikai was brought up; Kikai muses on India and compares it with the Yamagata of his youth.

Me to kaze no kioku ("Memories of the eye and the wind", 2012) collects essays published in Yamagata Shinbun (山形新聞) since 2006; Dare omo sukoshi suki ni naru hi: Memekuri bōbiroku ("Days when you come to like anyone a little: An image-turning aide-memoire", 2015) collects essays published in Bungakukai (文學界) since 2011; Kutsuzoku no herikata ("Ways to wear down shoe rubber", 2016) is a fourth collection.

== Exhibitions ==
Supplementary English titles in parentheses are nonce translations for this article; those outside parentheses and in quotation marks were used at the time.

- [A]: Asakusa portraits
- [I]: India
- [S]: Portraits of spaces
- [T]: Turkey

=== Selected solo exhibitions ===
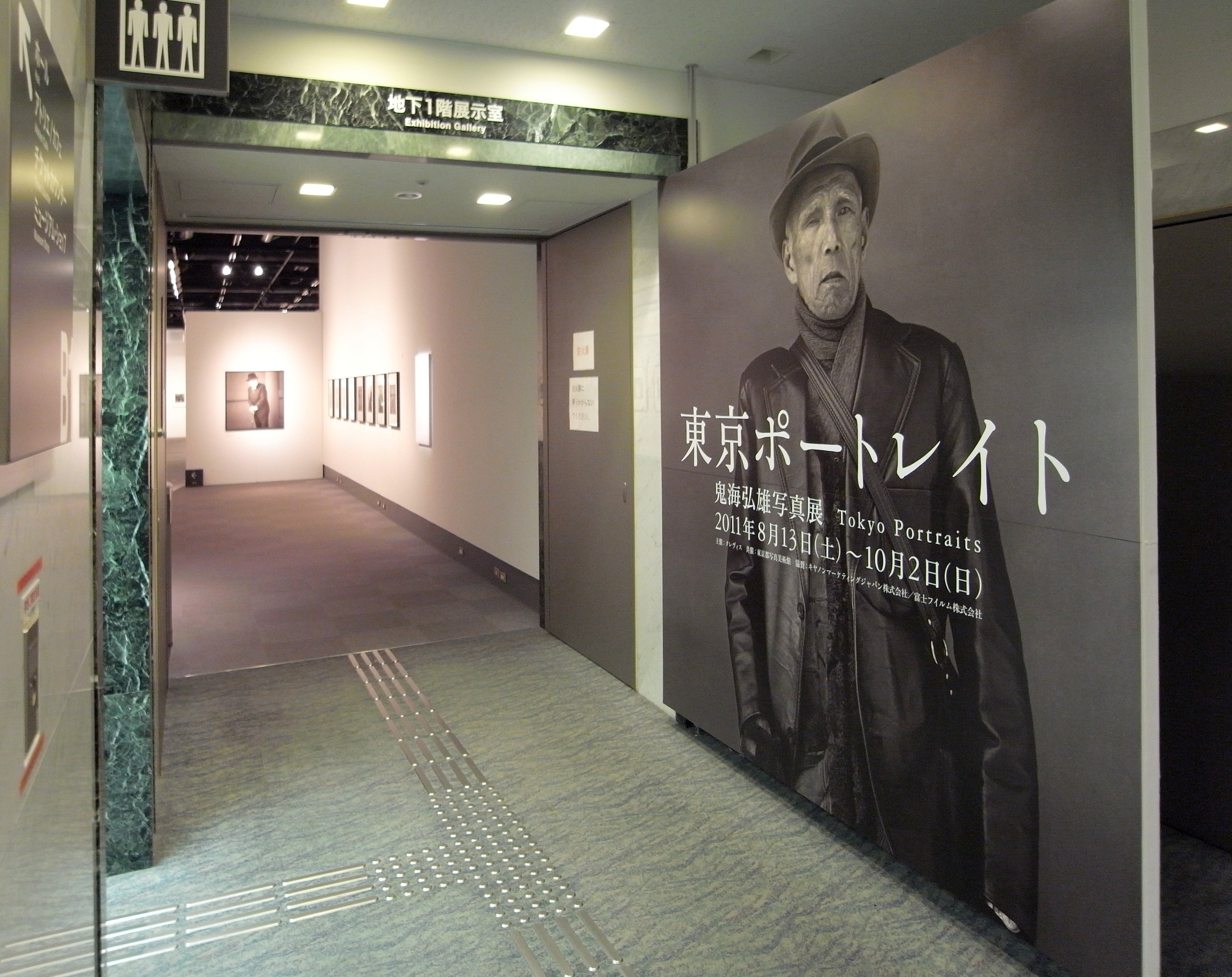
Entrance to the exhibition Tokyo Portraits at the Tokyo Metropolitan Museum of Photography, 12 August 2011

- "Nagi: Machinaka no kōkei" (凪：町中の光景, Calm: Town scenes). [S] Konishiroku Photo Gallery (Shinjuku, Tokyo), August–September 1983.
- "Indo kikō" (インド紀行, India travelogue). [I] Doi Photo Plaza Shibuya (Shibuya, Tokyo), August 1984; Art Plaza (Fukuoka), August 1984; Gallery Antomeru (Sendai), September 1984; Yamagata, 1984.
- "Ōtachi no shōzō (Sensōji keidai)" (王たちの肖像(浅草寺境内), Portraits of kings [in the grounds of Sensō-ji]). [A] Ginza Nikon Salon (Ginza, Tokyo), September 1988.
- "Dai-13 Ina Nobuo shō jushō sakuhinten: Kikai Hiroo 'Ōtachi no shōzō (Sensōji keidai)'" (第13伊奈信男賞受賞作品展・鬼海弘雄「王たちの肖像(浅草寺境内)」, Exhibition of works winning the 13th Ina Nobuo Award: Hiroh Kikai, Portraits of kings [in the grounds of Sensō-ji]). [A] Ginza Nikon Salon (Ginza, Tokyo); Osaka; Kyoto; etc., 1988–89.
- The Hitachi Collection of Contemporary Japanese Photography, Center for Creative Photography, Tucson, Arizona. 1989.
- "Dai-13-kai Ina Nobuo shō jushō sakuhinten: Kikai Hiroo 'Kanshō: Machi no katachi'" (第13回伊奈信男賞受賞作品展・鬼海弘雄「観照：町のかたち」, Exhibition of works winning the 13th Ina Nobuo Award: Hiroh Kikai, Meditation: Town shapes). [S] Osaka Nikon Salon, February 1990; Ginza Nikon Salon (Ginza, Tokyo), March 1990; Kyoto; etc., 1990.
- "Ecce Homo". [A] Robert Koch Gallery (San Francisco), 1993.
- "Indo kikō" (インド紀行, India travelogue). [I] Shōmeidō Gallery (Kodaira), 1998.
- "Persona (1)". [A] Centrum Sztuki i Techniki Japońskiej "Manggha" (Kraków), 1999.
- "Shashin to insatsu hyōgen" (写真と印刷表現, Photographs and printing expression). [S] Mitsumura Art Plaza (Ōsaki, Tokyo), February–March 2000.
- "Persona (2)". [A] Centrum Sztuki i Techniki Japońskiej "Manggha" (Kraków), November–December 2002.
- "Persona". [A] The Third Gallery Aya (Osaka), October 2003.
- "Persona". [A] Domon Ken Photography Museum (Sakata), September–November 2004.
- "Persona". [A] Ginza Nikon Salon (Tokyo); Osaka, 2004.
- "Persona". [A] Galeria Fotografii PF, Centrum Kultury "Zamek" (Poznań), February–March 2005.
- "Persona". [A] Shōmeidō Gallery (Kodaira) January 2005.
- "Perusona" (ぺるそな). [A] Ginza Nikon Salon (Ginza, Tokyo), February–March 2006; Osaka Nikon Salon (Osaka), April 2006.
- "Tōkyō mutan" (東京夢譚, Tokyo dreams). [S] Ginza Nikon Salon (Ginza, Tokyo), September 2007; Osaka Nikon Salon (Osaka), October 2007.
- "Tokyo Labyrinth". [S] Yancey Richardson Gallery (New York City), September–October 2008.
- "Jinsei gekijō" (人生劇場, Human theatre). [A] Gallery Raku, Kyoto University of Art and Design, Kyoto, March 2009.
- "Persona". [A] Yancey Richardson Gallery (New York City), May–July 2009.
- "Asakusai portrék". [A] Liget Gallery (Budapest), November–December 2010.
- "Anatoria e no purosesu" (アナトリアへのプロセス). [T] Aoyama Book Center (Omotesandō, Tokyo), January 2011.
- "Tōkyō pōtoreito" (東京ポートレイト) / "Tokyo portraits". [A, S] Tokyo Metropolitan Museum of Photography (Ebisu, Tokyo), August–October 2011.
- "Anatoria" (アナトリア). [T] M2 (Shinjuku, Tokyo), August 2011.
- "Persona". [A, S, I, T] Yamagata Museum of Art (Yamagata), December 2011 – January 2012.
- "Tokyo Labyrinth". [S] Zen Foto Gallery (Roppongi, Tokyo), May 2013.
- "Persona" / "Perusona" (ペルソナ). [A] 14th Documentary Photo Festival Miyazaki, Miyazaki Prefectural Art Museum, August–September 2013.
- "Asakusa Portraits (1973–2008) et India (1982–2008)". [A, I] In between Gallery (Paris), November 2013.
- "India 1982–2011". [I] Canon Gallery S (Shinagawa, Tokyo), May–June 2014.
- "Retratos de Asakusa". [A] Tabacalera, Promoción del Arte (Madrid), September–November 2014.
- "India 1982–2011". [I] The Museum of Art, Ehime (Matsuyama, Ehime), September–October 2014.
- "Tôkyô: voyage à Asakusa". [A, S] Société d'encouragement pour l'industrie nationale, Paris 6. October 2015.
- "India 1979–2016" [I] Fujifilm Photo Salon (Tokyo), May–June 2017.
- 《人物》鬼海弘雄的肖像摄影. [A] See+ Art Space / Gallery (Beijing), December 2017 – February 2018.
- "Persona". [A] Photo Gallery Blue Hole (Katagami, Akita), August 2018 – January 2019.
- "Persona". [A] Kihoku town office (鬼北町役場庁舎), Kihoku, Ehime, February 2019.
- "Persona". [A] Sagae City Museum of Art, Sagae, Yamagata, April–June 2019.
- "Persona: The Final Chapter" / "Persona saishūshō" (Persona 最終章). [A] Irie Taikichi Memorial Museum of Photography Nara City, September–October 2019.
- "Persona: The Final Chapter 最終章". [A] In between Gallery (Paris), November–December 2019.
- "Ōtachi no shōzō" (王たちの肖像, Portraits of kings). [A] JCII Photo Salon (Tokyo), June–August 2020.

=== Selected group exhibitions ===
- "The Hitachi Collection of Contemporary Japanese Photography". Center for Creative Photography, University of Arizona, 1988.
- "Nyū dokyumentsu 1990" (ニュー・ドキュメンツ 1990) / "New Documents 1990". Museum of Modern Art, Toyama (Toyama), 1990.
- "Shashin toshi Tōkyō" (写真都市Tokyo) / "Tokyo/City of Photos". [A] (Other photographers exhibited were Takanobu Hayashi, Ryūji Miyamoto, Daidō Moriyama, Shigeichi Nagano, Ikkō Narahara, Mitsugu Ōnishi, Masato Seto, Issei Suda, Akihide Tamura, Tokuko Ushioda, and Hiroshi Yamazaki.) Tokyo Metropolitan Museum of Photography, 1995.
- "Shashin wa nani o katareru ka" (写真は何を語れるか。What can photographs say?). [I] Tokyo Metropolitan Museum of Photography, June; Osaka Umeda Canon Salon, July; Fukuoka Canon Salon, August; Nagoya Canon Salon, September; Sapporo Canon Salon, October; Sendai Canon Salon, November 1997.
- "Berlin–Tokyo". Neue Nationalgalerie, Berlin, 2006.
- "Tōkyō meiro / Andesu Kuero" (東京迷路・アンデスケロ村) / "Tokyo Labyrinth / Andes Qero". [S] (With Yoshiharu Sekino, who exhibited photographs taken of the Q'ero.) Shōmeidō Gallery (Kodaira), July 2007.
- "Heavy Light: Recent Photography and Video from Japan". [A] International Center of Photography (New York), May–September 2008.
- "Sander's Children". [A] Danziger Projects, New York, 2008.
- Mit anderen Augen. Das Porträt in der zeitgenössischen Fotografie = With Different Eyes: The Portrait in Contemporary Photography. [A] Die Photografische Sammlung/SK Stiftung Kultur, Cologne, 26 February – 29 May 2016; Kunstmuseum Bonn, 25 February – 8 May 2016.
- "Faces from Places". [A] L. Parker Stephenson Photographs, Manhattan, 6 May – 16 July 2016. With Mike Disfarmer, Sirkka-Liisa Konttinen, J. D. 'Okhai Ojeikere, Malick Sidibé, and Jacques Sonck.

== Permanent collections ==
- Tokyo Metropolitan Museum of Photography: 17 photographs from the series Ōtachi no shōzō (later known as Persona or Asakusa Portraits), 1985–86.
- Museum of Modern Art, Toyama (Japan)
- Domon Ken Photography Museum (Sakata, Yamagata, Japan)
- Neue Nationalgalerie (Berlin)
- Walther Collection (Neu-Ulm, Germany / New York): 16 photographs from the series Asakusa Portraits
- Center for Creative Photography (University of Arizona, Tucson)
- Hood Museum of Art (Dartmouth College, Hanover, New Hampshire)
- Museum of Fine Arts, Houston (Texas)
- Museum of the International Center of Photography (New York)
- Mead Art Museum (Amherst College, Amherst, Massachusetts)
- Philadelphia Museum of Art (Pennsylvania)

== Publications ==
=== Books by Kikai ===
- Ōtachi no shōzō: Sensō-ji keidai (王たちの肖像：浅草寺境内) / Ecce homo: Portraits of kings. Yokohama: Yatate, 1987. NCID BN02320562. Photograph collection, with captions in Japanese and English, and an essay by Sadayoshi Fukuda. There are forty-one monochrome plates.
- India. Tokyo: Misuzu Shobō, 1992. ISBN 4-622-04385-8. Photograph collection, with text (by Kikai and Munesuke Mita) in Japanese and English, and captions in English. There are 106 monochrome plates (all "landscape" format).
- Ya-Chimata: Ōtachi no kairō (や・ちまた：王たちの回廊, Ya-Chimata: A gallery of kings). (Note: Ya-Chimata (in other contexts written in the kanji 八衢 rather than in hiragana) means a place where a road divides into eight (or some comparable number), or a place where the paths are confusingly numerous. For a dictionary definition (in Japanese), see 八衢（やちまた） の意味 (goo辞書).) Tokyo: Misuzu Shobō, 1996. ISBN 4-622-04409-9. Photograph collection, with text (by Kikai and ten other writers) in Japanese only. There are 183 monochrome plates.
- Tōkyō meiro (東京迷路) / Tokyo Labyrinth. Tokyo: Shōgakukan, 1999. ISBN 4-09-681241-2. Photograph collection, with text (by Andrzej Wajda, Genpei Akasegawa, and Suehiro Tanemura) in Japanese only. There are 108 monochrome plates.
- Indo ya Gassan (印度や月山, India and Gassan). Tokyo: Hakusuisha, 1999. ISBN 4-560-04928-9. Thirty essays and forty-one photographs; text in Japanese only. The monochrome photographs are a mixture of "landscape" (across two pages) and "portrait" (on single pages).
- Shiawase: Indo daichi no kodomo-tachi (しあわせ：インド大地の子どもたち) / Shanti: Children of India. Tokyo: Fukuinkan, 2001. ISBN 4-8340-1779-6. Photograph collection (all monochrome): thirteen "landscape" photographs across both pages; and ninety-four "portrait". There are no captions, and the text is in Japanese only. (Note: Fukuinkan's description (in Japanese) of Shanti is here.)
- Persona. Tokyo: Sōshisha, 2003. ISBN 4-7942-1240-2. Photograph collection, with captions and text (by Andrzej Wajda, Suehiro Tanemura, and Kikai) in both Japanese and English. Between an additional plate at the front and back, there are twelve plates in a prefatory section (photographs taken well before the others), and in the body of the book twenty-eight plates four to a page and 138 plates on their own pages.
- Perusona (ぺるそな) / Persona. Tokyo: Sōshisha, 2005. ISBN 4-7942-1450-2. Second, popular edition of the 2003 Persona in a smaller format. There are additional essays and photographs by Kikai; captions in both Japanese and English, other text in Japanese only. The twelve prefatory plates of the first edition and 191 plates of the main series are each presented on a separate page; there are also three more plates of photographs outside the series. (Note: Sōshisha's description (in Japanese) of the second edition of Persona (with 24 sample photographs) is here.)
- In-between 8: Kikai Hiroo Porutogaru, Maruta (In-between 8 鬼海弘雄 ポルトガル、マルタ) / In-between, 8: Hiroh Kikai, Portugal, Malta. Tokyo: EU–Japan Fest Japan Committee, 2005. ISBN 4-903152-07-3. One of a series of 14 books (NCID BA72485871). Photograph collection; captions and text in both Japanese and English. There are twenty-eight colour photographs of Portugal and twenty-seven of Malta. (Note: The EU–Japan Fest Japan Committee's description of In-between 8 is here.)
- Tōkyō mutan (東京夢譚) / Labyrinthos. Tokyo: Sōshisha, 2007. ISBN 4-7942-1572-X. Collection of 118 monochrome photographs and essays; captions (for each, the approximate address and the year) and essays are in Japanese only.
- Asakusa Portraits. New York: International Center of Photography; Göttingen: Steidl, 2008. ISBN 978-3-86521-601-4. Collection of monochrome photographs; captions and texts in English only. With an interview of Kikai by Noriko Fuku, essays by Kikai (translated from Perusona) and an essay on Asakusa by Hiromichi Hosoma. (Note: Steidl's description of Asakusa Portraits is here.)
- Anatoria (アナトリア) / Anatolia. Tokyo: Crevis, 2011. ISBN 978-4-904845-10-3. Collection of 140 monochrome photographs (all "landscape" format) of Turkey (not only Anatolia). With afterwords by Toshiyuki Horie and Kikai. (Note: Crevis's description (in Japanese) of Anatolia is here.)
- Tōkyō pōtoreito (東京ポートレイト) / Tokyo Portraits. Tokyo: Crevis, 2011. ISBN 978-4-904845-14-1. Exhibition catalogue of over 150 monochrome photographs of the "Asakusa portraits" and "portraits of spaces" series. Afterwords (by Shinji Ishii, Iwao Matsuyama, and Nobuyuki Okabe [岡部信幸]) in Japanese only; captions in Japanese and English. (Note: Crevis's description (in Japanese) of Tokyo Portraits is here.)
- Me to kaze no kioku: Shashin o meguru esē (眼と風の記憶 写真をめぐるエセー). Tokyo: Iwanami, 2012. ISBN 978-4-00-024952-2. Essay collection.
- Seken no hito (世間のひと). Chikuma Bunko. Tokyo: Chikuma Shobō, 2014. ISBN 978-4-480-43156-1. A bunkobon anthology of the Asakusa portrait series.
- Dare o mo sukoshi suki ni naru hi: Memekuri bōbiroku (誰をも少し好きになる日 眼めくり忘備録). Tokyo: Bungei shunjū, 2015. ISBN 978-4-16-390215-9. Essay collection.
  - Naxie jianjian xihuan shang ren de rizi (那些渐渐喜欢上人的日子 视线所至备忘录). Hunan: 浦睿文化·湖南文艺出版社, 2019. ISBN 978-7-5404-9074-4. Translation into Chinese by 连子心.
- Tokyo View. Kyoto: Kazetabi-sha, 2016. A large-format collection of 117 monochrome photographs of the "portraits of spaces" series. Captions in Japanese and English; afterword by Hideki Maeda in Japanese only. (Note: Kazetabi's description (in Japanese) of Tokyo View is here.)
- Kutsuzoku no herikata (靴族の減り方). Tokyo: Chikumashobo, 2016. ISBN 978-4-480-87621-8. Essay collection, contains 32 full-page plates from the "portraits of spaces" series. (Note: Chikumashobo's description (in Japanese) of Kutsuzoku no herikata is here.)
- India 1979–2016. Tokyo: Crevis, 2017. ISBN 978-4-904845-83-7. Black and white plates, mostly one to a page, with captions in Japanese. With a preface by Kikai and an essay by Randy Taguchi; all in Japanese only. (Note: Crevis's description (in Japanese) of India 1979–2016 is here.)
- Persona saishūshō 2005–2018 (Persona 最終章 2005–2018) / Persona: The Final Chapter, 2005–2018. Tokyo: Chikumashobo, 2019. ISBN 978-4-480-87399-6. 205 captioned black and white plates, one to a page; with essays by Kikai and Toshiyuki Horie; all both in Japanese and in English translation. (Note: Chikumashobo's description (in Japanese) of Persona: The Final Chapter is here.)
- Kotoba wo utsusu: Kikai Hiroo taidanshū (ことばを写す 鬼海弘雄対談集, Portraying words: Hiroh Kikai interview collection). Tokyo: Heibonsha, 2019. ISBN 978-4-582-23130-4. Interviews by Kikai of Taichi Yamada, Nobuyoshi Araki, Toshiko Hirata, Shūsuke Michio, Randy Taguchi, Shigeru Aoki, Toshiyuki Horie and Natsuki Ikezawa; edited by Jun'ichirō Yamaoka. (Note: Heibonsha's description (in Japanese) of Kotoba wo utsusu is here.)
- Shanti: Persona in India. Tokyo: Chikumashobo, 2019. ISBN 978-4-480-87401-6. 168 captioned black and white plates, one to a page; with essays by Kikai and Shinji Ishii; all both in Japanese and in English translation. (Note: Chikumashobo's description (in Japanese) of Shanti is here.)
- Ōtachi no shōzō (王たちの肖像, "Portraits of kings"). JCII Photo Salon Library 346. Tokyo: JCII Photo Salon, 2020. NCID BB31276856. (Note: 鬼海弘雄作品展 「王たちの肖像」 (catalogue sales page), JCII Camera Museum, [2020]. Accessed 27 August 2020.) Photographs from the series later known as "Asakusa portraits", from 1973 to 1986; 22 photographs, one per page; plus four photographs on each of four pages.

=== Other books with contributions by Kikai ===
- Shashin toshi Tōkyō (写真都市Tokyo) / Tokyo/City of Photos. Tokyo: Tokyo Metropolitan Museum of Photography, 1995. Catalogue of an exhibition held in 1995. Plates 113–29, admirably printed, are from Kikai's series of Asakusa portraits. Captions and texts in both Japanese and English.
- Literatura na świecie (Warsaw, ISSN 0324-8305) number 1–3, 2002. This special issue on Japanese literature, Japonia, is illustrated with photographs by Kikai, taken from Ya-Chimata and Tōkyō meiro / Tokyo Labyrinth. Text in Polish.
- Ueda Makoto. Shūgō jūtaku monogatari (集合住宅物語, The story of collective housing). Tokyo: Misuzu, 2004. ISBN 4-622-07086-3. A book about collective housing in Japan from the Dōjunkai buildings onward, with 165 illustrative color photographs, all by Kikai. (Some monochrome photographs are older and are by other photographers.) The text, by Ueda, is in Japanese only. Content previously (1997–2001) published in Tokyojin. (Note: Misuzu's description (in Japanese) of Shūgō jūtaku monogatari is here.)
- In-between: 13-nin no shashinka 25-kakoku (In-between 13人の写真家 25ヶ国) / In-between: 13 photographers, 25 nations. Tokyo: EU–Japan Fest Japan Committee, 2005. ISBN 4-903152-13-8. Kikai is one of the thirteen in this supplementary collection of photographs in six themes ("Stones and walls", "Words", etc.); captions and text in both Japanese and English.
- Miyako Harumi. Messēji (メッセージ) / The Message. Tokyo: Juritsusha, 2006. ISBN 4-901769-41-3. A book of which about half consists of quotations from interviews with the enka singer Harumi Miyako, and the other half of color photographs by Kikai. The photographs are not described or identified; a handful are of Miyako but most are of sea and provincial views. (In many, the scenes are recognizably of the Kumano area just west of Kumanogawa, Wakayama.) The text is all in Japanese. (Note: Juritsusha's description (in Japanese) of The message is here.)
- Heavy Light: Recent Photography and Video from Japan. New York: International Center of Photography; Göttingen: Steidl, 2008. ISBN 978-3-86521-623-6. Captions and texts in English only.
- Higashi-Nihon dai-jishin: Shashinka 17-nin no shiten (東日本大地震 写真家17人の視点, The great east Japan earthquake: The perspectives of 17 photographers). Special compilation by Asahi Camera. Tokyo: Asahi Shinbunsha, 2011. ISBN 978-4-02-330996-8. A collection of photographs of the aftermath of the 2011 Tōhoku earthquake and tsunami. Text in Japanese only. Kikai contributes six pages: Sōma in early June, and three towns in Miyagi in late August.
- Kikai Hirô and Jean-François Sabouret. Tôkyô: voyage à Asakusa. Atlantique, Éditions de l'Actualité Scientifique Poitou-Charentes, 2015. ISBN 978-2-911320-55-2. An introduction to the work of Kikai, in French and Japanese.
- Gabriele Conrath-Scholl and Stephan Berg, eds. Mit anderen Augen. Das Porträt in der zeitgenössischen Fotografie = With Different Eyes: The Portrait in Contemporary Photography. Cologne: Snoeck, 2016. ISBN 978-3-86442-158-7. Catalogue of the exhibition.
