= Hiroshi Yamazaki =

Japanese photographer (1946–2017)

Hiroshi Yamazaki (Japanese: 山崎 博, Hepburn: Yamazaki Hiroshi; 21 September 1946 – 5 June 2017) was a Japanese photographer whose works concentrate on the sun and the sea.

Born in Nagano on 21 September 1946, Yamazaki studied at Nihon University but dropped out in 1968, starting out as a freelance cameraman a year later, working in both still photography and 16mm film.

Yamazaki is best known for two series. "Heliography" uses long exposures to show the path of the sun near the horizon. "Horizon" (Suiheisen saishū) is a study of sea horizons.

Yamazaki won the 26th Ina Nobuo Award in 2001.

Yamazaki became a full professor at Tohoku University of Art and Design in 1993, and also taught at Musashino Art University and TPO Photo School.

He died on 5 June 2017 of cancer of the gums.

== Solo exhibitions by Yamazaki ==
- "Observation". Galleria Grafica (Tokyo), 1974, 1976, 1977, 1978, 1979.
- Exhibition of 16mm work. Underground Cinématheque (Tokyo), 1976.
- Exhibition. Box Gallery (Nagoya), 1981.
- "Optical Landscape on Movie". Image Forum (Tokyo), 1982.
- "Yamazaki Hiroshi 1972–82". Zeit Foto Salon (Tokyo), 1982.
- "Ten Points Heliography". Konishiroku Photo Gallery (Tokyo), 1982.
- "Heliography Day and Year". Ginza Nikon Salon (Tokyo), 1982.
- "Optical Landscape". Nagase Photo Salon (Tokyo), and elsewhere, 1983, 1987, 1989.
- "Suiheisen saishū". Polaroid Gallery (Tokyo), 1984.
- "Suiheisen saishū II". Olympus Gallery (Tokyo); Picture Photo Space (Osaka), 1984.
- "Fix and Movement" (movie exhibition). Funabashi Seibu Art Spot (Funabashi), 1990.
- "Sakura". Zeit Foto Salon (Tokyo), 1990.
- "Critical Landscape". Hillside Gallery (Tokyo), 1990.
- "Yamazaki Hiroshi 1969–1992". Plaza Gallery (Tokyo), 1993.
- "Sakura – Equivalent". Hosomi Gallery (Tokyo), Temporary Space (Sapporo), 1993.
- "Walking Works". Gallery Art Graph (Tokyo), 1994.
- "Suiheisen saishū III". Contax Salon (Tokyo), 1994.
- "Cherry Blossom". Ginza Nikon Salon (Tokyo), Osaka Nikon Salon (Osaka), 2001.
- "Yamazaki Hiroshi Early Works" 1969–1974". Place M (Tokyo), 2002.
- "Cherry Blossom". Shinjuku Nikon Salon (Tokyo), Osaka Nikon Salon (Osaka), 2005.
- "Ugoku shashin! Tomaru Eiga!!". Creation Gallery G8, Guardian Garden (Tokyo), 2009.

== Publications by Yamazaki ==
=== Books by Yamazaki ===
- Heliography. Tokyo: Seikyūsha 1983. Text in both Japanese and English.
- Suiheisen saishū: Yamazaki Hiroshi shashinshū (水平線採集：山崎博写真集) / Horizon. Tokyo: Rikuyōsha, 1984. ISBN 4-89737-094-9
- Hiroshi Yamazaki: Critical landscape. Tokyo: Hillside Gallery, 1990.

=== Other books with work by Yamazaki ===
- Shashin toshi Tōkyō (写真都市Tokyo) / Tokyo / City of Photos. Tokyo: Tokyo Metropolitan Museum of Photography, 1995. Catalogue of an exhibition held in 1995. (Other photographers whose work appears are Takanobu Hayashi, Hiroh Kikai, Ryūji Miyamoto, Daidō Moriyama, Shigeichi Nagano, Ikkō Narahara, Mitsugu Ōnishi, Masato Seto, Issei Suda, Akihide Tamura, and Tokuko Ushioda.) Captions and texts in both Japanese and English.
- Stack, Trudy Wilner, ed. Sea change: The seascape in contemporary photography. Tucson, Ariz.: Center for Creative Photography, 1999. ISBN 0-938262-32-7

== Publications about Yamazaki ==
- Yamazaki Hiroshi, "Ugoku shashin! Tomaru eiga!!" (山崎博「動く写真! 止まる映画!!」). Time Tunnel series, vol. 28. Tokyo: Guardian Garden, 2009.

== See also ==
- Chris McCaw
