= Taiji Arita =

Japanese photographer (1941–2011)

Taiji Arita (有田 泰而, Arita Taiji; 1941–2011) was a Japanese commercial photographer who exhibited non-commercial nudes and other work, and later a painter and sculptor.

== Early life ==
Taiji Arita was born on January 31, 1941, in what is now Kitakyūshū, Japan. After briefly studying law at Chuo University, he opted to instead pursue a career as a photographer and studied under Yasuhiro Ishimoto at Tokyo College of Photography.

== Artistic career ==
=== Photography ===
From 1964 to 1966 Arita worked at Nippon Design Center; from 1967 to 1977 he freelanced for numerous publishers and the advertising industry, also working as a movie cameraman.

In 1977, Arita published "First Born", a series of monochrome and color images of his first wife and son taken over three years. That same year, Arita left Tokyo for Ontario where he continued freelance photography for Canadian and Japanese advertising and publishing industries.

In 1980, he returned to Tokyo and opened Arita Studio, specializing in photography for advertising and publishing industries and cinematography for television commercials. Among his photographic assistants was Yoshihiko Ueda. He married Masako Koiso in 1984.

=== Painting ===
From about 1980 on, Arita started to paint in oils as well as continuing to be active as a photographer. In 1988, he published "The Forest of the Naked", a collection of 71 paintings of the human figure in contorted positions. Arita's paintings are similar to his photographs in transforming the physical body into part of an object.

For Arita, art was not just painting, sculpting or photographing, rather it was a way of living. Despite having attained professional acclaim while living in Japan, he became disillusioned. He yearned for a freer existence in which he could create for the sheer joy of creating. In 1991, he left Tokyo for Southern California where he worked as contributing photographer and videographer to Japanese publishers and television broadcasting companies, and began spending more time creating paintings and sculptures.

=== Move to California ===
In 2000, Arita moved to the coastal area of Mendocino County in Northern California to begin a life devoted solely to the creation of art with his second wife Masako. There he designed and built a house and studio where he, along with Masako, created his final body of work, "Fruit of the Redwoods" using Coast Redwood salvaged from the remnants of 1000-year-old trees. This project became a point of reference for several of the area's woodworkers, many of whom studied at the Fine Wood Working Program founded by James Krenov.

== Death ==
Arita died in Fort Bragg, California, on July 17, 2011, at 70. A posthumous printing of Arita's First Born folio was undertaken by Yosihiko Ueda in late 2011 for publication November 2012, with accompanying exhibits in Tokyo and Paris Photo 2012. Also published in 2012, Pure: Taiji Arita in California: Life and Work, which photographically chronicles the last twenty years of Arita's life.

== Solo exhibitions ==
- 1977 Fāsuto bōn (ファーストボーン) / "First Born". Ginza Nikon Salon, Tokyo.
- 1980 Arita Taiji shashinten (有田泰而写真展) / "Retrospective". Photo Gallery International, Tokyo.
- 1982 "The Photographs of Taiji Arita". Photo Gallery International, Tokyo (photographs)
- 1982 "18 Paintings". Tokyo Designer's Space, Tokyo (paintings)
- 1983 Sutorīto faito (ストリート・ファイト) / "Street Fight". Tokyo Designer's Space, Tokyo (paintings and photographs)
- 1983 Serufu pōtorēto (セルフポートレート) / "Self Portraits". Polaroid Gallery, Tokyo.
- 1984 Hyakka ryōran: Nihon no ie (百花繚乱：日本の家) / "Extravaganza: Japanese Buildings". Pentax Forum, Tokyo.
- 1988 Rasha no mori (裸者の森) / "Forest of the Naked". Seed Hall, Tokyo (paintings)
- 1989 Akai tsuchi (赤い土) / "Red Earth". Gallery Face, Tokyo (paintings)
- 2000 "Forest of the Naked 2". The Loft Gallery, Santa Monica, CA (paintings)
- 2007 "Ovalism". North Coast Artists Gallery, Fort Bragg, CA (paintings)
- 2008 "Prime". Art3g, Fort Bragg, CA (paintings and sculpture)
- 2009 "Fruit of the Redwoods" (with Masako Arita). Art3g, Fort Bragg, CA (reliefs)

== Selected group exhibitions ==
- 1978 "Japan: A self portrait", International Center for Photography, New York (photographs)
- 1986 "Sūpā imēji no sekai" (スーパー・イメージの世界) / "Works in 20×24 Polaroid", Seed Hall, Tokyo (photographs)
- 1991 "Nihon no shashin, 1970 jidai: Tōketsu sareta 'toki' no kioku" (日本の写真、1970年代：凍結された「時」の記憶) / "Japanese Photography in the 1970s: Memories Frozen in Time". Tokyo Metropolitan Museum of Photography
- 2007 "One" art3g, Fort Bragg, CA (painting)
- 2007 "The Power of Six", Odd Fellows Hall, Mendocino, CA (sculpture)
- 2007 "Found Objects", North Coast Artists Gallery, Fort Bragg, CA (sculpture)
- 2008 "Green Bones" (with Harry Albrecht), art3g, Fort Bragg, CA (paintings)
- 2010 "Out of the Woods", NorthCoast Artist Gallery, Fort Bragg CA (reliefs)
- 2010 "Pas de Deux", Odd Fellows Hall, Mendocino CA (paintings)
- 2010 "New American Art", Odd Fellows Hall, Mendocino CA (paintings)
- 2010 "Watakushi o mite: Nūdo no pōtoreito" (私を見て！ヌードのポートレイト). Tokyo Metropolitan Museum of Photography.
- 2011 "Work & Love", Mendocino Art Center, Mendocino CA (paintings & reliefs)
- 2012 "Taiji Arita Memorial Retrospective & Group Show" Odd Fellows Hall, Mendocino CA (sketches, paintings & sculptures)

== Permanent collections ==
- Tokyo Metropolitan Museum of Photography
- Sapporo Art Park (Sapporo)

== Publications showing Arita's works ==
- "First Born", serialized in Camera Mainichi, May 1973 – February 1975.
- Shōji Yamagishi, ed. Japan: A Self-Portrait. New York: International Center of Photography, 1979. ISBN 0-933642-01-6 / ISBN 0-933642-02-4. (This should not be confused with the 2004 book Japan, a Self-Portrait: Photographs 1945–1964, ed. Osamu Hiraki and Keiichi Takeuchi.)
- Rasha no mori: Arita Taiji, 1981–1987 (裸者の森 有田泰而、1981–1987) / The Forest of the Naked: Taiji Arita, 1981–1987. Tokyo: Libro Port, 1988. ISBN 4-8457-0321-1. A book of paintings.
- Nihon no shashin, 1970 jidai: Tōketsu sareta "toki" no kioku (日本の写真、1970年代：凍結された「時」の記憶) / Japanese Photography in the 1970s: Memories Frozen in Time. Tokyo: Tokyo Metropolitan Museum of Photography, 1991. (in Japanese and English) Pp. 98–107.
- Nihon nūdo meisakushū (日本ヌード名作集, Japanese nudes). Camera Mainichi bessatsu. Tokyo: Mainichi Shinbunsha, 1982. (in Japanese) Pp. 246–47.
- PURE Taiji Arita in California: Life & Work: Blurb Books, 2012, ed. Inga Peterson and Jason Cowan. A photographic chronicle of Arita's daily life & artwork from 1991-2011.
