= Shigeru Tamura =

Shigeru Tamura may refer to:

- Shigeru Tamura (photographer) (1909–1987), Japanese photographer
- Akihide Tamura (b. 1947), Japanese photographer (also known as Shigeru Tamura)
- Shigeru Tamura (illustrator) (born 1949), Japanese illustrator, animator, and manga artist
