= Tetsuya Ichimura =

Japanese photographer

Tetsuya Ichimura (一村 哲也, Ichimura Tetsuya; born 1930) is a Japanese photographer noted for his photographs of nudes.

== Early life ==
Ichimura was born, with the family name Hamaguchi, in Nagasaki on 10 June 1930. As a young adult Ichimura moved to Tokyo, where he studied for a year at Nihon University, took various jobs, and chanced to meet Shōtarō Akiyama, who aroused his interest in photography.

== Photography career ==
Ichimura won a special award at the First International Subjectivism Photo Exhibition (国際主観主義写真展, Kokusai Shukanshugi Shashinten), held at Takashimaya in Nihonbashi, Tokyo, in 1956. The exhibition was held in the same year that the newly founded Japan Subjective Photography League was established and brought together prewar avant-garde figures such as Kansuke Yamamoto alongside younger postwar photographers including Ikkō Narahara and Yasuhiro Ishimoto. He quickly moved to nude photography, and had his first solo exhibition, "Love & Lost", in Fuji Photo Salon in 1963.

He also participated in exhibitions overseas: "New Japanese Photography" in New York (7 Works owned by MoMA) in 1974 and an exhibition of eight Japanese photographers in Graz in 1976. From the late 1970s Ichimura branched out to photographs of Japanese iconography and landscape, particularly that of his native Nagasaki.

== Books by Ichimura ==
- Konna sei no hanashi mo aru (こんな性の話もある). Tokyo: Besutoserāzu, 1970. Text by Daihachi Izumi, photographs by Ichimura.
- Seidan to nūdo no fūkei (聖談とヌードの風景). Tokyo: Besutoserāzu, 1970.
- Kyōki no utage Salome (狂気のうたげSalome). Tokyo: Jitsugyō no Nihon sha, 1970.
- Come Up. Tokyo: Shashinhyōronsha, 1971.
- Onna to otoko: Imayō shunga (女と男：今様春画). Gendai Shashinka Shirīzu. Tokyo: Ado angen, 1972. With Yoshihiro Tatsuki and Tenmei Kanō.
- Shashin no shisō (写真の思想). Tokyo: Bijutsu Shuppansha, 1978.
- Nihon no kokoro (日本のこころ) / Impressions of Japan. Tokyo: Canon Club, 1978.
- Onna soshite daraku... (女そして堕落…). Tokyo: Besutoserāzu, 1983. ISBN 4-584-17024-X.
- Nagasaki (長崎). Tokyo: Asahi Shinbunsha, 1988. ISBN 4-02-255918-7.
- (さくら花) / Sakura Blossom. Tokyo: Nippon Camera-sha, 1992.
- Body: Mega・sexual photo. Tokyo: Hanashi no Tokushū, 1994. ISBN 4-8264-0137-X.
- Ichimura Tetsuya feromon sakuhinshū: "Shunga" erotic picture do H (一村哲也フェロモン作品集："Shunga" erotic picture do H). Tokyo: Wanimagajinsha, 1995. ISBN 4-89829-234-8.
- Tsuyu: Neo-waisetsu shashinshū (露：Neo猥褻写真集). Tokyo: Hokuō Shobō / Japan Mix, 1997. ISBN 4-88321-342-0.

== Other books with photographs by Ichimura ==
- (in Japanese) Nihon nūdo meisakushū (日本ヌード名作集, Japanese nudes). Camera Mainichi bessatsu. Tokyo: Mainichi Shinbunsha, 1982. Pp. 228–33 show Ichimura's work.
- Szarkowski, John, and Shōji Yamagishi. New Japanese Photography. New York: Museum of Modern Art, 1974. ISBN 0-87070-503-2 (hard), ISBN 0-87070-503-2 (paper). Includes six pages of photographs by Ichimura.
