= Tadasuke Akiyama =

Japanese photographer

Tadasuke Akiyama (秋山 忠右, Akiyama Tadasuke; born 17 March 1941) is a Japanese photographer.

Born in Shinagawa, Tokyo, in 1941, Akiyama studied in the Faculty of Political Science of Waseda University and then went to Tokyo College of Photography, graduating in 1964. He became an assistant to Yasuhiro Ishimoto but very quickly turned freelance. With Haruo Satō, he created Wakai gunzō (若い群像), a series of photographs of young people within crowds, taken close up with a wide-angle lens that won acclaim; it led to a series of collaborations with Satō.

Akiyama traveled to east and west Europe just before the destruction of the Berlin Wall; he also photographed carnivals in the West Indies at around this time.

Akiyama taught at Punjab College of Photography from 1970.

== Books by Akiyama ==
- Kokkyō Rurō (国境流浪). Tokyo: Heibonsha, 2010. ISBN 4-582-82377-7.
- Kūsatsu Dai-Tōkyō (空撮大東京). Tokyo: Shōbunsha, 1991. ISBN 4-398-22151-4.
- Nihon kūchū kikō (日本空中紀行) / Sky Landscape. Tokyo: Jiji Tsūshin, 1994. ISBN 4-7887-9401-2.
- Kokkyō Rurō (国境流浪) / Wandering about the Boundaries. 2 vols. Kyoto: Kyōto Shorin, 1998. ISBN 4-7636-1708-7 (vol. 1), ISBN 4-7636-1709-5 (vol. 2).
- Nippon air scope: Tori no yō ni kaze no yō ni (Nippon air scope: 鳥のように風のように). Kyoto: Kyōto Shorin, 1999. ISBN 4-7636-1711-7.
- Tokyo air scope: Kūchū ni sankyaku o tateru (空中に三脚を立てる). Kyoto: Kyōto Shorin, 1999. ISBN 4-7636-1726-5.
- Farmer. Tokyo: Tōseisha, 2000. ISBN 4-924725-97-8.
- Nogyō o yarō! (農業をやろう!). Tokyo: Sankaidō, 2000. ISBN 4-381-10372-6.
