= Makoto Ueda (architecture critic) =

Japanese editor and architecture critic

Makoto Ueda (植田実, Ueda Makoto, born 1935) is an editor and architecture critic.

After graduating in French literature from Waseda University, Ueda worked as an editor of architectural magazines, notably as chief editor of Toshi Jūtaku.

== Books by Ueda ==
- Anjero Manjarotti: 1955–1964 / Anjero Manjarotti sekkei (アンジェロ・マンジャロッティ: 1955–1964 / アンジェロ・マンジャロッティ設計, Angelo Mangiarotti, 1955–64 / The designs of Angelo Mangiarotti). Tokyo: Seidōsha, 1965.
- Japan hausu: Uchihanashi konkurīto jūtaku no genzai (ジャパン・ハウス：打放しコンクリート住宅の現在) / Japan House in Ferroconcrete. Tokyo: Graphic-sha, 1988. ISBN 4-7661-0460-9.
- Mayonaka no ie: Ehon kūkan-ron (真夜中の家：絵本空間論, Houses late at night). Tokyo: Sumai-no-toshokan-shuppankyoku, 1989. ISBN 4-7952-0824-7.
- Apātomento: Sekai no yume no shūgō jūtaku (アパートメント：世界の夢の集合住宅, The condominium: The world dream of collective housing). Tokyo: Heibonsha, 2003. ISBN 4-582-63400-1.
- Shūgō jūtaku monogatari (集合住宅物語, The story of collective housing). Tokyo: Misuzu, 2004. ISBN 4-622-07086-3. A lavishly illustrated book about collective housing in Japan (primarily Tokyo and environs). It is well over three hundred pages long, with about fifty pages devoted to Dōjunkai buildings. The (color) photography for the book is by Hiroh Kikai, supplemented by older photographs. The content first appeared in Tokyojin from 1997 to 2001.

== See also ==
- Architecture criticism
