= Tokyo College of Photography =

Japanese vocational school of photography

Coordinates: 35°32′50.3″N 139°38′39.35″E

The Tokyo College of Photography (東京綜合写真専門学校, Tōkyō Sōgō Shashin Senmon-Gakkō) was set up in Nakano, Tokyo in 1958, as Tokyo Photo School (東京フォトスクール, Tōkyō Foto Sukūru); its current name dates from 1960. During the 1960s, it moved to Hiyoshi (Yokohama), where it has remained.

== Notable graduates ==
- Tadasuke Akiyama
- Takanobu Hayashi
- Eiji Ina
- Norio Kobayashi
- Shisei Kuwabara
- Seiichi Motohashi
- Kishin Shinoyama
- Shinzō Hanabusa
- Bishin Jumonji
- Osamu Kanemura
- Satoshi Kuribayashi
- Mitsugu Ōnishi
- Ko Si-chi
- Issei Suda
- Akihide Tamura
- Hiromi Tsuchida
- Kanendo Watanabe
