= Bishin Jumonji =

Japanese photographer

Front cover of Jūmonji Bishin no shigoto to shūhen, incorporating a photograph of the middle-aged Jumonji, and, in the place of his face, a headless photograph taken by Jumonji in 1971/2.

Bishin Jumonji (十文字 美信, Jūmonji Bishin) is a Japanese photographer known for advertising, portrait, and architectural work.

Jumonji was born in Yokohama on 4 March 1947. After studying at the Tokyo College of Photography he worked as an assistant to Kishin Shinoyama and went freelance in 1971, working as the photographer for advertisements for Matsushita Electric and Shiseido products.

The association with Matsushita would later bring awards from the Art Directors Club every year from 1975 to 1979. Jumonji has continued to do editorial and commercial work (notably for Hayashibara Biochemical Laboratories).

In 1972, with nine other photographers, he participated in an exhibition of portraits of Simon Yotsuya at the Kinokuniya Gallery in Shinjuku.

Jumonji had started taking his "Untitled" series of portraits of people framed to exclude their heads in 1971. In 1972, these appeared in the magazine Camera Mainichi and were shown in the Neikrug gallery in New York; a year later they were included in "New Japanese Photography", at the New York MoMA.

Up to 1980, Jumonji made nineteen trips to Hawaii, photographing the islands and photographing and interviewing elderly first-generation Japanese immigrants. The series juxtaposes photographs of Hawaiʻi and black-and-white portraits of the people living there. Installments were published in Camera Mainichi in 1979 and the set was exhibited in 1980, when it won the Ina Nobuo Award. It was published, as Orchid Boat, in 1981.

Jumonji's second published collection was Kéntauros, a large-format booklet of black-and-white photographs of the members of the motorbike organization Kéntauros striking poses with switchblades and other props.

In 1981, Jumonji went to Indochina to photograph the religious customs of the Yao people. In 1983–84 he visited Thailand, Burma and Laos. The result was published as Sumitōtta yami in 1987.

Jumonji had started photographing gold works of art in 1981. The first exhibition of the results was in Matsuya department store (Ginza), in 1987. This work culminated in the book Ōgon fūtenjin, published in 1990. This won the Domon Ken Award the following year. Some of these works would also be shown in two of a set of four volumes of stereoscopes, all photographed by Jumonji and published in 1993–4.

Jumonji started photographing architecture and gardens in 1988, and the Katsura Detached Palace in particular in 1991.

Jumonji photographed Matsumoto Kōshirō IX for a collection of black-and-white portraits; in 2005 he published a second volume, Nippon Geki-gan, of monochrome portraits of actors taken with a large-format camera shortly before or after performance.

In 1998, Jumonji started work on Wabi, his attempt to depict (in color) the Japanese aesthetic ideal of wabi. The project started with cha-no-yu but branched out into everyday scenes.

Jumonji exhibited composite photographs of four Japanese waterfalls at the Shiseido Gallery (Ginza) in June and July 2004.

Jumonji's photographs have appeared in Zoom and Stern.

== Bibliography ==
=== Books by Jumonji ===
- Ran no fune (蘭の舟) / Orchid Boat. Tokyo: Tōjusha, 1981. OCLC 21304534; NCID BN12843432. (in Japanese) The title alone is in English as well as Japanese.
- Kéntauros. Tokyo: CBS Sony, 1984. ISBN 4-7897-0132-8. (in Japanese)
- Sumitōtta yami (澄み透った闇, Darkness becoming visible). Tokyo: Shunjūsha, 1987. ISBN 4-393-33203-2. (in Japanese)
- Ōgon fūtenjin (黄金風 天人). Tokyo: Shōgakukan, 1990. ISBN 4-09-699371-9. (in Japanese) Brief captions in English; all other text in Japanese only.
- Katsura rikyū (桂離宮, Katsura Detached Palace). Nihon Mei-kenchiku shashin senshū 19. Tokyo: Shinchōsha, 1993. ISBN 4-10-602638-4. With text by Teiji Itō (伊藤ていじ, Itō Teiji) and Satoshi Yamato (大和智, Yamato Satoshi). (in Japanese)
- Poketto butsuzō (ポケット仏像 / A Pocketful of Buddhist Statues. 3D Stereo Museum. Tokyo: Shinchōsha, 1993. Vol. 1 ISBN 4-10-395101-X. Vol 2 ISBN 4-10-395102-8. (in Japanese)
- Poketto ni ōgon (ポケットに黄金 / A Pocketful of Golden Treasures. 3D Stereo Museum. Tokyo: Shinchōsha, 1994. ISBN 4-10-395103-6. (in Japanese)
- Poketto ni Byōdō-in (ポケットに平等院 / A Pocketful of Uji Byodo-in Temple. 3D Stereo Museum. Tokyo: Shinchōsha, 1994. ISBN 4-10-395104-4. (in Japanese)
- Katsura rikyū (桂離宮, Katsura Detached Palace). Tonbo no hon. Tokyo: Shinchōsha, 1996. ISBN 4-10-602043-2. With text by Machi Tawara. (in Japanese)
- Jūmonji Bishin no shigoto to shūhen (十文字美信の仕事と周辺, The work and surroundings of Bishin Jumonji). Artist, Director and Designer Scan no. 10. Tokyo: Rikuyōsha, 2000. ISBN 4-89737-357-3. (in Japanese) Samples of Jumonji's personal and advertising work.
- Wabi (わび) / Wabi. Kyoto: Tankōsha, 2002. ISBN 4-473-01944-6. (in English and Japanese) Captions and text in both Japanese and English.
- Koshiro Matsumoto. Purejidento, 2002. ISBN 4-8334-1745-6. (in Japanese)
- Ochiru mizu (落ちる水 / Water Falls. Tokyo: Shiseidō Kigyō Bunkabu, 2004. A set of cards in a box, for the exhibition held in June and July 2004. OCLC 674588713; NCID BA69614615. (in Japanese)
- Nippon gekigan (日本劇顔) / Nippon geki-gan: Dramatic portraits of actors and actresses. Tokyo: Pia, 2005. ISBN 4-8356-1578-6. (in English and Japanese) Captions and most text in English as well as Japanese.
- Futatabi kage (ふたたび翳). Tokyo: Jūmonji Jimusho, 2006. OCLC 1014235134.
- Iru barusamiko (イルバルサミコ) / Il Balsamico. Tokyo: Kyūryūdō, 2007. ISBN 978-4-7630-0707-0. (in Japanese) Photographs of the Modena area and the production of balsamic vinegar.
- Kansei no bakemono ni naritai (感性のバケモノになりたい) / Beyond the Senses. Tokyo: Kyuryudo Art Publishing, 2007. ISBN 978-4-7630-0730-8. (in Japanese) Over five hundred pages long, this is a chronological survey of Jumonji's work.
- Murofushi Kōji: Kodoku na ōja (室伏広治 孤独な王者). Tokyo: Bungei Shunju, 2010. ISBN 4163731105. (in Japanese) Photographs of the hammer thrower Koji Murofushi.
- Kenchiku o irodoru tekisutairu: Kawashima orimono no bi to waza 建築を彩るテキスタイル 川島織物の美と技 / Textiles for Architecture: The beauty and artistry of Kawashima textiles. Tokyo: Lixil, 2012. ISBN 9784864805018.
- Aru mono (或るもの). Tokyo: Jūmonji Jimusho, 2015.
- Torikai. Two books, Kusatsugawa (草津川) and Ginkō Torikai (吟香鳥飼), in a box. Hitoyoshi, Kumamoto: Torikai Shuzō, 2016. Photographs by Jumonji; text by Kazunobu Torikai. About the shōchū maker Torikai Shuzō.
- Tsunenaramu (常ならむ) / Passing. Tokyo: Jūmonji Jimusho, 2017. NCID BB24104577.

=== Others ===
- Matsuoka, Seigow (松岡正剛, Matsuoka Seigō). Yūkō no hakubutsugaku (遊行の博物学, Diverting museology). Tokyo: Shunjūsha, 1987. ISBN 4-393-33109-5. Jumonji contributes a number of photographs for chapter 5, about gold works of art.
- Szarkowski, John, and Shoji Yamagishi. New Japanese Photography. New York: Museum of Modern Art, 1974. ISBN 0-87070-503-2 (hard), ISBN 0-87070-503-2 (paper). This includes a single photograph from the "Untitled" series.
