= Ko Si-chi =

Taiwanese photographer (1929–2020)

Ko Si-chi (1929-2020) was a Taiwanese artist best known for his photography. He was Taiwan's first contemporary photographer.

== Biography ==
Ko Si-chi was born in 1929 in Tainan. He took his first photographs at the age of 19. His family home was destroyed by an American bombing raid during World War II. When he was 30 he traveled to Japan to attend the Tokyo Photo School, after completing his education he moved to New York City to pursue a career in commercial photography. In the 1970s he returned to Taiwan. In his later years he embarked on a project to “portray Taiwanese scenery from different, unique perspectives” and in doing so to re-center a career spent largely abroad.

He is particularly well known for his photos of the environment but also had a passion for photographing dance and dancers.

Ko Si-chi died in June 2020.

== Awards and recognition ==
Ko received Taiwan's National Award for Arts in 2006.

== See also ==
- Taiwanese art
