= Suehiro Tanemura =

Suehiro Tanemura (種村 季弘, Tanemura Suehiro, 21 March 1933 – 29 August 2004) was a translator (from German into Japanese) and critic.

Tanemura was born in Toshima, Tokyo in 1933. His mother died in 1946. He became interested in German while still a teenager, and entered the University of Tokyo in 1951. He first majored in aesthetics but switched to German literature, graduating in 1957 and for a short time thereafter working in Kōbunsha in editing the women's magazine Josei Jishin.

From 1963 until 1968, Tanemura taught as an adjunct lecturer at Komazawa University. In 1968 he obtained a tenured post at Tokyo Metropolitan University, but he resigned in 1971 and went to Europe, where he spent much time until 1978, when he took another tenured post at Kokugakuin University, where he would teach until December 2002. At around this time he was diagnosed with cancer, from which he died in 2004.

Tanemura was a prolific translator from German, writer and anthologizer of others' writings, with a certain tendency toward subjects like vampires and Sacher-Masoch. His own writings were first collected in a ten-volume set in 1979; two decades later this was supplemented by an eight-volume set.

== Collected works ==
- Tanemura Suehiro no rabirintos (種村季弘のラビリントス, The labyrinth of Suehiro Tanemura). 10 volumes. Tokyo: Seidosha, 1979.
- Tanemura Suehiro no neo-rabirintos (種村季弘のネオ・ラビリントス, The neo-labyrinth of Suehiro Tanemura). 8 volumes. Tokyo: Kawada Shobō Shinsha, 1998–9.
