= Sadayoshi Fukuda =

Japanese social philosopher and critic

Sadayoshi Fukuda (福田 定良, Fukuda Sadayoshi; April 6, 1917 – December 12, 2002) was a Japanese social philosopher and critic.

== Biography ==
Fukuda was the pseudonym of Yukiari Segawa (瀬川 行有, Segawa Yukiari), born on 6 April 1917. He studied philosophy at Hosei University (Tokyo), graduating in 1940. In 1944 he was sent to Halmahera; he returned to Japan in 1946. Two years later he started teaching philosophy at his old university, where he would stay until 1970. Thereafter he supported himself by his writing.

Fukuda — the name he used as a teacher as well as a writer — was a prolific author: a hyōronka (critic or pundit) and popularizer of philosophy. He died on 11 December 2002.

== Sources ==
- Gendai Nihon shippitsusha daijiten (現代日本執筆者大事典) / Contemporary writers in Japan. 5 vols. Tokyo: Nichigai Associates, 1979.
- Hyōronka jinmei-jiten (評論家人名事典) / Japanese critics and commentators: A biographical dictionary. Tokyo: Nichigai Associates, 1990. ISBN 4-8169-1002-6
- 20-seiki Nihon jinmei-jiten (20世紀日本人名事典) / Major 20th-century people in Japan: A biographical dictionary. 2 vols. Tokyo: Nichigai Associates, 2004. ISBN 4-8169-1853-1
