= Masatoshi Naitō =

Japanese photographer (1938–2025)

Masatoshi Naitō (内藤 正敏, Naitō Masatoshi; 18 April 1938 – 9 July 2025) was a Japanese photographer. His work is held in the collection of the Museum of Modern Art in New York.

== Early life and education ==
Naitō was born in Tokyo on 18 April 1938. He graduated from Waseda University in applied sciences and trained as a research scientist.

== Life and work ==
A keen interest in the folkloric traditions of Japan led him to pursue a career in photography. His work on the ethnological customs of the region of Tōhoku became the focus of his 1970s series: Ba Ba Bakuhatsu (Grandma Explosion).

Early on in his career, Naitō photographed the mummies of Buddhist priests who had died fasting for the salvation of starving farmers in Dewa Sanzan and then started making photographs that focused on the folk religions and ethnology of Tōhoku. In this body of work (1968–1970), Naitō portrayed itako, female shamans who invoke the spirits of the dead. Female shamanism used to be widespread within Japan; today it is limited to this region where the more esoteric sides of Eastern religion are still practiced. These female shamans photographed starkly by Naitō are celebrating death. They mourn the dead by performing rituals and dancing all night to evoke the spirits of the deceased. These women are exuberant and celebrate death not life. Naitō paid homage to this time-old tradition with his bright flash, graphically illuminating the characters he depicts. As he observed: "The vitality of women comes from the earth. They embrace everything like goddesses and the title Ba Ba Bakuhatsu (Grandma Explosion) came to my mind naturally."

Tōno Monogatari (1983) focuses on a similar subject matter in the town of Tōno, in Iwate Prefecture. The title echoes that of a popular 1910 book by folklorist Yanagita Kunio. Again using an open flash and mostly working at night, Naitō's images endow people and objects alike with a mystical aura. He weaves ancient tales into contemporary photographic narratives.

Naitō died on 9 July 2025, at the age of 87.

== Publications ==
- Miira shinko no kenkyū = Study of the Mummy Faith. Daiwa Shobō, 1974.
- Dewa Sanzan and Shugen. Kosei, 1982.
- Tōno Monogatari. Shunju-sha, 1983.
- Tōhoku no sei to sen = Tōhoku Sacred and Profane. Hosei University Press, 2007.

== Awards ==
- 1966: New Artist Award from the Japan Photo Critics Association
- 1982: second prize, Domon Ken Award for his book Dewa Sanzan and Shugen

== Exhibitions ==
=== Solo exhibitions ===
- Masatoshi Naito Photography and Folklore, Kichijoji Art Museum, 2009
- Naito Masatoshi: Another World Unveiled, Tokyo Photographic Art Museum, Tokyo, May–July 2018

=== Group exhibitions ===
- New Japanese Photography, Museum of Modern Art, New York, 1974
- Beyond Japan, Barbican Centre, London, 1991
- Beginnings, Forever: From the Collection of the Kiyosato Museum of Photographic Arts / Shinnyo-en, Museum of Photographic Arts, San Diego, CA, April–September 2021

== Collections ==
Naitō's work is held in the following permanent collection:

- Museum of Modern Art, New York
