= Kazuo Nishii =

Japanese magazine editor and photography critic

Kazuo Nishii (西井一夫, Nishii Kazuo, 1946–2001) was a Japanese magazine editor and photography critic.

Nishii was born in Tokyo in 1946. He graduated in economics from Keio University in 1968, and shortly after this

moved to the company publishing Mainichi Shimbun, rising via stints at Sunday Mainichi and Mainich Graph to become editor in chief of Camera Mainichi from 1983 until the magazine folded in 1985. After the demise of Camera Mainichi, Nishii worked as an editor for various book-publishing projects of Mainichi Shinbun-sha. Nishii first proposed the Society of Photography Award and played a major role in setting it up.

== Books by Nishii ==
- Hizuke no aru shashinron (日付けのある写真論). Tokyo: Seikyūsha, 1981. (in Japanese)
- Shashin to iu media (写真というメディア, The medium called photographs). Tokyo: Tōjunsha, 1982. (in Japanese)
- Shōwa 20-nen Tōkyō chizu (昭和二十年東京地図, A map of Tokyo, 1945–50). Tokyo: Chikuma Shobō, 1986. ISBN 4-480-85330-8. (in Japanese)
- Shōwa 20-nen Tōkyō chizu: zoku (昭和二十年東京地図：続, A map of Tokyo, 1945–50, continued). Tokyo: Chikuma Shobō, 1987. ISBN 4-480-85398-7. (in Japanese)
- Kurayami no ressun (暗闇のレッスン). Tokyo: Misuzu Shobō, 1992. ISBN 4-622-04239-8. (in Japanese)
- Sengo 50-nen (戦後50年, Fifty years after the war). Tokyo: Mainichi Shinbunsha, 1995. (in Japanese)
- Distance: Eiga o meguru danshō (Distance: 映画をめぐる断章). Tokyo: Kage Shobō, 1996. ISBN 4-87714-225-8. (in Japanese)
- Shashinteki kioku (写真的記憶, Photographic memories). Tokyo: Seikyūsha, 1997. ISBN 4-7872-7072-9. (in Japanese)
- Shashin no yosoyososhisa (写真のよそよそしさ). Tokyo: Misuzu Shobō, 1996. ISBN 4-622-04252-5. (in Japanese)
- Naze imada "Purovōku" ka (なぜ未だ「プロヴォ-ク」か). Tokyo: Seikyūsha, 1996. ISBN 4-7872-7062-1. (in Japanese)
- 20-seki shashinron: Shūshō (20世紀写真論・終章). Tokyo: Seikyūsha, 2001. ISBN 4-7872-7144-X. (in Japanese)
- Daido Moriyama. Phaidon 55. London: Phaidon, 2001. ISBN 0-7148-4023-8. (in English)
- Shashin-henshūsha: Yamagishi Shōji e no omāju (写真編集者 山岸章二へのオマージュ, Photo editor: A homage to Shōji Yamagishi). Tokyo: Mado-sha, 2002. ISBN 4-89625-038-9. (in Japanese)
