= Hiromi Tsuchida =

Japanese photographer

Hiromi Tsuchida (土田ヒロミ, Tsuchida Hiromi; born 1939) is a Japanese photographer. His creative photo career is over 40 years long. Tsuchida has produced several collections of photographs of the aftermath of the atomic bombing of Hiroshima. He has produced many photo books such as Zokushin, Counting Grains of Sand, New Counting Grains of Sand and The Berlin Wall. There is also a retrospective of his life's work titled, Hiromi Tsuchida's Japan. Tsuchida has received the Nobuo Ina Award and the Ken Domon Award.

== Life and work ==
Tsuchida was born in 1939 in Fukui Prefecture. He graduated from the Faculty of Engineering, University of Fukui.

In 1971, he began his career as a photographer and won the 8th Annual Taiyo Magazine Award. In 1976, he turned his focus on Japanese folk nature and published Zokushin. In 1978 he received the Nobuo Ina Award for his work about Hiroshima and the aftermath of the atomic bomb. He continued to document that theme with Hiroshima Monument and Hiroshima Collection. In 1995, he started digital photography. More recent works include, The Berlin Wall (1999), "Shin Suna wo Kazoeru" (New Counting the Grains) (2002), and Fake Scape (2002).

Tsuchida is a committee member of the Nikon Salon. After serving as principal of the Tokyo College of Photography, he became an Affiliate professor at Osaka University in 2000.

In 2007, Hiromi Tsuchida's Japan, a retrospective, was held at the Tokyo Metropolitan Museum of Photography where he was presented with the 27th Annual Ken Domon Award.

== Awards ==
- 8th Annual Taiyo Magazine Award
- 1971 Solar Award
- 1978 Ina Nobuo Award
- 2008 Domon Ken Award

== Collections ==
His works can be found in the Tokyo Metropolitan Museum of Photography, the Museum of Modern Art in New York, the French National Library in Paris, the National Gallery of Canada, the European Photography Center, San Francisco Museum of Modern Art, and the J. Paul Getty Museum.
