= Gashō Yamamura =

Japanese photographer

Gashō Yamamura (山村 雅昭, Yamamura Gashō; 1939–1987) was a renowned Japanese photographer born in Osaka.
