= Ryōji Akiyama =

Japanese photographer

Ryōji Akiyama (秋山 亮二, Akiyama Ryōji; born 1942) is a Japanese photographer known for his work in Tsugaru and New York. He has also written about photography.

== Books by Akiyama ==
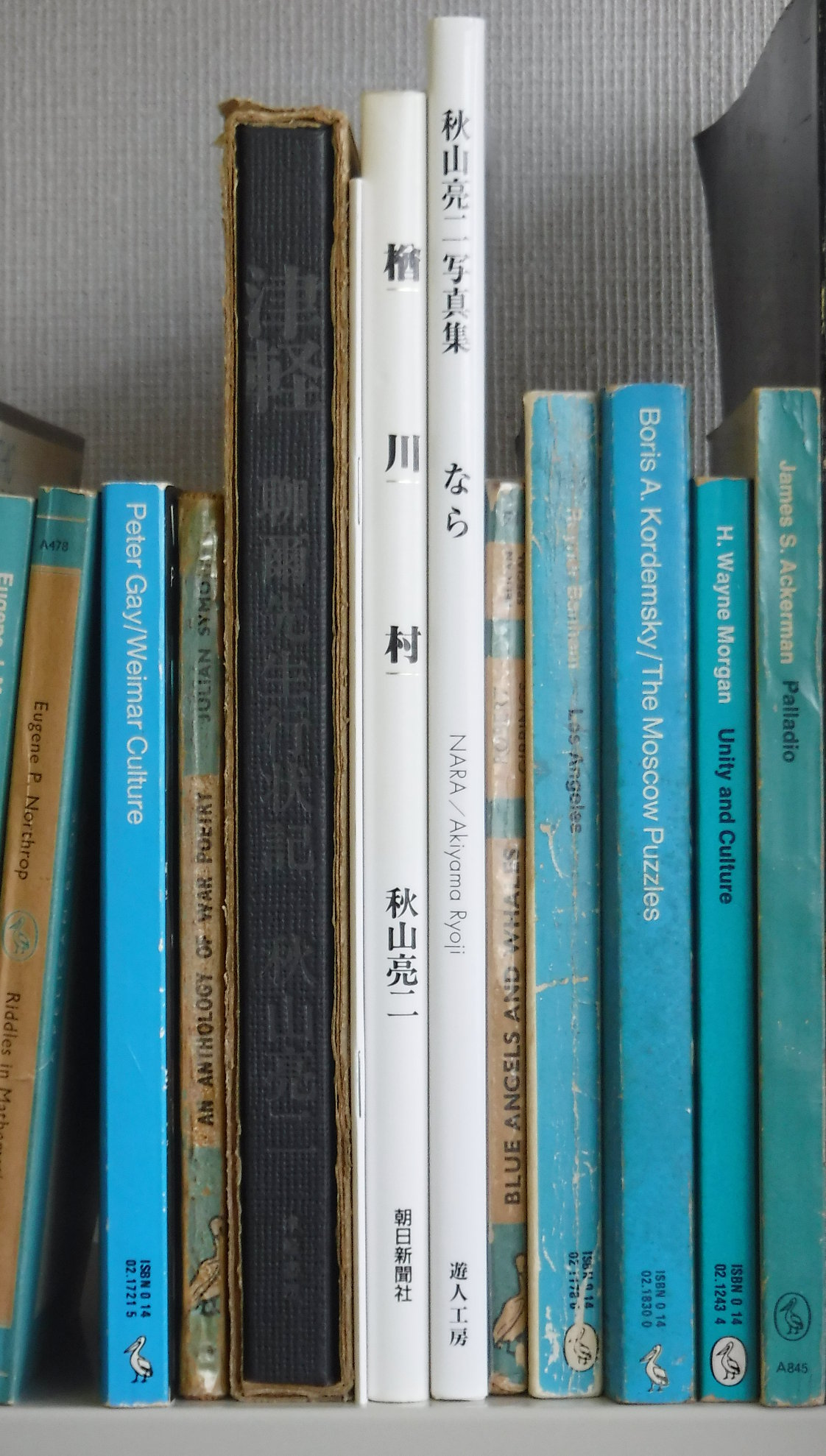
Books by Akiyama; left to right: Tsugaru (book); Tsugaru (exhibition catalogue); Narakawa-mura; Nara

- Tsugaru: Ryōji-sensei gyōjōki (津軽 聊爾先生行状記). Hirosaki: Tsugaru Shobō, 1978. (in Japanese) Photographs of Tsugaru.
- Nyūyōku tsūshin: Akiyama Ryōji shashin (ニューヨーク通信 秋山亮二写真). Tokyo: Bokusuisha, 1980. (in Japanese) Photographs of New York City.
- 你好小朋友 Chūgoku no kodomotachi: Akiyama Ryōji shashinshū (你好小朋友 中国の子供達 秋山亮二写真集). Tokyo: Sakura Family Club, 1983. (in Japanese) Photographs of children in China.
- Narakawa-mura (楢川村). Tokyo: Asahi-shinbunsha, 1991. ISBN 4022562528. (in Japanese) Photographs of Narakawa (Nagano prefecture).
- Fotokontesuto hisshō gaido (フォトコンテスト必勝ガイド) / Photo Contest Success Guide. Reberu-appu mook. Tokyo: Gakken, 1995. ISBN 4056011362. (in Japanese)
- Fotokontesuto hisshō: Kodomo no torikata (フォトコンテスト必勝 子どもの撮り方). Reberu-appu mook. Tokyo: Gakken, 1998. ISBN 405601843X. (in Japanese)
- Kodomo no shashin no torikata: Kawaiku toru kihon kara fotokontesuto chōsen made(子どもの写真の撮り方—かわいく撮る基本からフォトコンテスト挑戦まで). Tokyo: Gakken, 1999. ISBN 4054011586. (in Japanese) Book about taking photographs of children.
- "Tsugaru Ryōji-sensei gyōjōki": Akiyama Ryōji sakuhinten (「津軽聊爾先生行状記」 秋山亮二作品展). JCII Photo Salon Library 118. Tokyo: JCII Photo Salon, 2001. (in Japanese) Booklet showing photographs from the series shown in the book of 1978.
- Nara: Akiyama Ryōji shashinshū (なら 秋山亮二写真集) / Nara. Tokyo: Yūjin Kōbō, 2006. ISBN 4-903434-03-6. (in Japanese and English) Photographs of Nara.
- Sensu no kemuri: Shashinka no tsūshinbo (扇子のケムリ 寫眞家の通信簿). 2014. ISBN 9784908108129
