= Ken Ohara =

Japanese photographer

Ken Ohara (小原 健, Ohara Ken; born 1942) is a Japanese photographer. Ohara is most noted for his series of photographs titled ONE, in which he presents anonymous faces with standard size and tone.

Ohara moved from Tokyo to New York City in 1962. In 1970 while working as an assistant to HIRO and Richard Avedon, he published ONE, which contained more than 500 tight close-ups of anonymous people's faces he shot on the New York streets. This work was first exhibited at the New York Museum of Modern Art in its 1974 exhibition New Japanese Photography, attracting critical attention. In the last 50 years since then, Ohara has achieved a series of experimental portrait projects in varied formats. They include self-portraits shot every minute for 24 hours (24 Hours), daily photo journals for the duration of one year (Self-Portrait 365 series), and the portraits of 123 local residents near his studio with whom he shots while opening a camera shutter for exactly 60 minutes (with series).

Ohara's work offers an intense examination of space and time in portraiture and provokes a rethinking of the limits of photographic depiction. His work is currently represented by Miyako Yoshinaga Gallery in New York City and in the permanent collection of the Smithsonian American Art Museum, Metropolitan Museum of Art, San Francisco Museum of Modern Art, Museum of Modern Art, New York, Los Angeles County Museum of Art, Folkwang Museum, The Getty Research Institute, The Museum of Fine Arts, Houston, among others.

Ohara resides in Los Angeles, California.

From October 10, 2025–February 8, 2026, the Whitney Museum exhibited Ken Ohara: Contacts. Over two years in the 1970s, Ohara sent a camera (pre-loaded with film) to a stranger and asked them to document their lives; the artist asked the stranger to then return the camera, along with the name and address of the next recipient. The camera traveled to 36 states and over 100 participants.
