= Jun Morinaga =

Japanese photographer (1937–2018)

Jun Morinaga (森永 純, Morinaga Jun; 1937 – 5 April 2018) is a Japanese photographer.

Morinaga worked as an assistant to W. Eugene Smith.

Work by Morinaga is held in the permanent collection of the Tokyo Metropolitan Museum of Photography.
