= Mitsugu Ōnishi =

Japanese photographer

Mitsugu Ōnishi (大西みつぐ, Ōnishi Mitsugu; born 7 October 1952) is a Japanese photographer.

Born in Tokyo, Ōnishi graduated from the Tokyo College of Photography in 1974, rejoining a year later as a teacher, and staying there in that capacity until 1994. Ōnishi photographed everyday life and his native Tokyo; he later turned his attention to suburban housing projects. Ōnishi won the 22nd Taiyō award in 1985, and the 18th Kimura Ihei Award in 1993. In addition to the collections of his photographs, he has written books about photography and cameras. He continues to live in Tokyo.

== Books of photographs by Ōnishi ==
- Wonder Land. Frog, 1989.
- Tōi natsu (遠い夏) / The long vacation. Waizu, 2001. ISBN 4-89830-125-8
- (in Japanese) Shitamachi junjō kamera (下町純情カメラ, Innocent Shitamachi camera). Tokyo: Ei, 2004. ISBN 4-7779-0201-3 A bunkobon, much of which is devoted to color photographs of Tokyo's shitamachi.

== Source, links ==
- Ōnishi's site (requires Flash)
- (in Japanese) Ōnishi's CV and sample photos, hosted by Nikon
- (in Japanese) Nihon shashinka jiten (『日本写真家事典』, 328 Outstanding Japanese Photographers). Kyoto: Tankōsha, 2000. ISBN 4-473-01750-8
