= Masato Seto =

Japanese photographer

Masato Seto (瀬戸正人, Seto Masato) is a Japanese Thai photographer.

== Biography ==
Seto was born in Udon Thani, Thailand, to a Vietnamese mother and a Japanese father. He moved to Fukushima Prefecture, Japan in 1961 and studied photography at Tōkyō Shashin Senmon Gakkō (東京写真専門学校), graduating in 1973. After further study under Daidō Moriyama, Seto became an assistant to Masahisa Fukase in 1978. In 1981 he became a freelance.

Seto has worked on various photographic projects. The best known may be Living Room, an exhibition and then a book of a strip of single and group portraits of Japanese and foreign residents of Tokyo in their homes. This won the Kimura Ihei Award.

Seto in 2008 had his first solo show of photographs in his native country of Thailand. The exhibition featured his first two series of color photographs "Picnic" and "Binran." The show was put together by curator Connelly La Mar with support from the Japan Foundation in February at H Gallery.

Yancey Richardson Gallery [www.yanceyrichardson.com] in New York City now represents his work for the U.S. market.

== Books by Seto ==
- Bankoku, Hanoi 1982–1987 (バンコク、ハノイ 1982–1987). ICP, 1989. ISBN 4-87198-784-1. Photograph collection.
- Heya (部屋) / Living Room Tokyo. Tokyo: Shinchōsha, 1996. ISBN 4-10-413101-6. Photograph collection.
- Silent Mode. Tokyo: Mole, 1996. Photograph collection.
- Tooi to Masato (トオイと正人). Tokyo: Asahi Shinbunsha, 1998. ISBN 4-02-257265-5. New edition as Ajia kazoku monagatari (アジア家族物語). Tokyo: Kadokawa, 2002. ISBN 4-04-367601-8. Essay collection.
- Picnic. Place M, 2005. ISBN 4-901477-21-8.
