= Shinzō Hanabusa =

Japanese photographer

Shinzō Hanabusa (英 伸三, Hanabusa Shinzō; born 1936) is a Japanese photographer. As a member of the Japanese Youth Delegation, he visited China during the Chinese-Japanese Youth Meeting in 1965.
