= Takanobu Hayashi =

Japanese photographer

Takanobu Hayashi (林 隆喜, Hayashi Takanobu) is a Japanese photographer.

== Early life ==
Hayashi was born in Dalian, China, in 1946, but his family then quickly moved to Japan, first to Beppu (Ōita) and then to Kyoto. He worked in a darkroom for a year after graduating from high school, and in 1965 moved to Tokyo, where he studied at the Tokyo College of Photography.

== Photography career ==
After graduating, Hayashi worked for two years as an assistant of Hajime Sawatari, and then started to freelance for fashion magazines. Since 1983 he has been teaching at the Tokyo College of Photography.

Hayashi works in black and white, often depicting a Tokyo rendered off-kilter by speculative and showy development.

Hayashi has participated in group exhibitions including “Empathy”, which went to Rochester (NY) and elsewhere in 1987. His first solo exhibition (in the Shinjuku Nikon Salon) came in 1983; he has exhibited intermittently since then.

Hayashi's only book to date is Zoo, a collection of photographs in zoos that managed to show the animals in (and sometimes dwarfed by) their man-made environs while barely showing any people; it has been praised for the purity (achieved with the help of retouching) and composition of its images. Zoo won the Higashikawa Prize in 1986. A series of photographs of roof spaces, Roof, won praise as a continuation of the themes of Zoo.

Hayashi also won an award from Konica in 1995.

== Book ==
- Zoo. Tokyo: the author, 1986. Includes 28 black and white plates. Captions (the names of the zoos) in English; no other text.
