= Ryūji Miyamoto =

Japanese sculptor

Ryūji Miyamoto 宮本 隆司
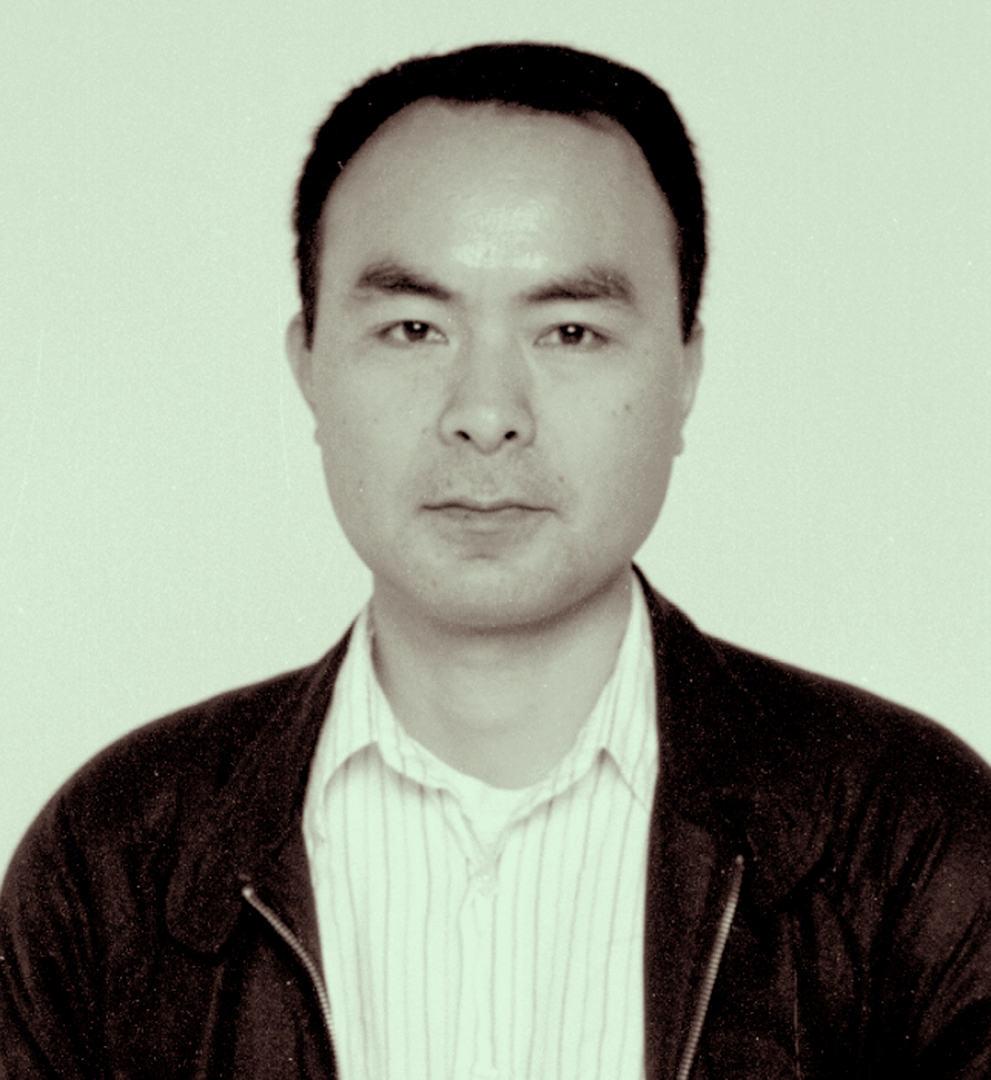
- Miyamoto in 1989
- Born: 1947 (age 78–79); Tokyo, Japan
- Education: Tama Art University
- Known for: Photography, architecture, contemporary art
- Notable work: Architectural Apocalypse, Cardboard House, KOBE 1995 After the earthquake

Ryūji Miyamoto (宮本 隆司, Miyamoto Ryūji, born 1947) is a Japanese photographer, best known as the "ruins photographer". Having studied graphic design at Tama Art University in Tokyo, he taught himself photography and began as an architectural journalist for magazines and newspapers. Inspired by the landscapes of post-war Japan that marked his childhood he came to reckon the imagery of destruction when he received a commission from Asahi Graph (pictorial journal) to document the demolition of the Nakano Prison in Tokyo.

His early work focusing on the demolition of modern buildings led to the Architectural Apocalypse series. He later thematized what he calls "handmade architecture" (tezukuri kenchiku) through his documentation of Kowloon Walled City and his survey of Cardboard Houses constructed by homeless people in Japan and around the world, documenting the ways in which people manage to inhabit the city informally.

In 1995, he applied the same survey method to document the Kobe earthquake (KOBE 1995 After The Earthquake). These images were later used as a basis for criticism of reconstruction methods that obscure the memory of the disaster and resulted in his selection for the Japanese Pavilion of the Venice Biennale of Architecture in 1996 by Arata Isozaki, known for his discourse on ruins. Miyamoto's turn between modern urban ruins and the impact of disasters was also embodied in the film: 3.11 TSUNAMI 2011, for which he changed his working method, co-creating it with three survivors of the 2011 Tōhoku earthquake and tsunami, feeling unable to document the disaster.

His photography, however, is never about the negativity of ruins. As the title of his retrospective exhibition at the Setagaya Art Museum in Tokyo (2004) evokes, he gazes at "things that are disappearing, things that are being born." His photographs exposes the ideology of progress in modern urban development, by uncovering its relation to heritage preservation, disasters, social downgrading, and informal lifestyles.

== Early life and career ==
Ryūji Miyamoto was born in Tokyo in 1947. He remembers his neighborhood, Toyama Heights in Shin-Okubo, Shinjuku as a "hilly area with municipal housing projects and elementary schools curiously interspersed among concrete ruins", that he considers as a typical view of Tokyo in the years just after World War II had ended.

He witnessed the rapid post-war urban changes, the reconstruction of cities, accelerated by the 1964 Tokyo Olympic and boosted by the Japanese economic miracle:

At the same time, old buildings with extensions and many different façades, a large number of brick buildings downtown, erected at the beginning of the Showa period, and the sheet-copper-sided homes and apartment buildings were all torn up by their roots. Everywhere, the streets were different, made new, everything was subordinated to efficiency, and perverted into a colorless space. Inconvenient old buildings were replaced with astounding speed; there was no time for them even to fall into decay.

— Ryūji Miyamoto, Temporary Ruins, Setting sun : writings by Japanese photographers. New York: Aperture. 2006. p.50.

Miyamoto studied at the Tama Art University and graduated from the graphic design department in 1973. During his studies, he participated to a discussion group called "Thought Collective Being", which is the starting point of the Bikyōtō collective, of which he was briefly a part. In the early 1970's, he worked as a designer and self-trained photographer for publications such as Toshi Jūtaku, Jūtaku Kenchiku, Asahi Graph, and Tokyojin. Miyamoto’s approach is indebted to his early years working as an architectural photographer, a field dominated by the so-called objective style of reportage photography (hōdō shashin). Miyamoto’s early career in architectural journalism suggests an origin for his interest in historic architecture and contextualizes his choice of serial photography as a form of preservation. Miyamoto took on the supposedly neutral role of reporter or "surveyor".

His career as an independent photographer gained momentum in 1983, when upon hearing of the impending demolition of the notorious Nakano Prison, he was contracted by the pictorial journal Asahi Graph to document the demolition. Miyamoto returned to the prison on his own throughout the demolition. As the interiors were dismantled and wall after wall came crashing down, he felt as if the materials that comprised the buildings were being released from their role as “Architecture” dictated by humans :

The site where a building is being demolished is like a time-tunnel that releases individual structures from their original purpose, and thus brings the buildings into existence. These buildings were disconnected from the builder, the architect, and the prisoners, and there was a reality to the feeling that the buildings entered a dimension different from the time-space they had occupied until then.

— Ryūji Miyamoto, Temporary Ruins, Setting sun : writings by Japanese photographers. New York: Aperture. 2006. p.50.

Ruins such as the Nakano prison remind him of the post-war landscapes he saw as a child.

After this project, Miyamoto began to photograph structures in the process of their dismantlement. He used the term kaitai genba ("scenes of dismemberment of a building") rather than ruin, drawing an analogy between building and human body (kaibô genba meaning anatomical dissection).

== Architectural Apocalypse ==
After documenting the demolition of Tokyo's Nakano Prison in 1983, Miyamoto spent five years observing the changing face of the city and its architecture. He focused on demolition sites, which he calls "tsukanoma no haikyo" or "temporary ruins". The curator Hasegawa Yuko describes this fondness for ruins as a "corrective reaction to the violent changes in the cityscape that had become the status quo."

Despite the recession in the Japanese economy, ceaseless streams of people still churn though the train terminals topped one after the next with new high-rise structures. On the surface, the city of Tokyo keeps molting its skin, emerging ever renewed, bright and shiny. Yet the shinier that superficial gleam appears, the deeper and darker grows the shadowed underside. (...) Photography is a construct of light and dark and photosensitive material. Whether photography does or doesn't go digital, I believe that basic rule still holds. Light passing through a lens or pinhole burns an image on photosensitive material kept in a dark space, fixing a set view of the world. The act of photographing is always an encounter between light and photosensitive material in darkness. As the dark underside of the city grows still deeper and darker, I'm sure we won't run out of further encounters between light and whatever photosensitive apparatus.

— Ryūji Miyamoto, Foreword, Miyamoto, Ryūji; 宮本隆司 (2003). Shin kenchiku no mokushiroku. 宮本隆司 (Shohan ed.). Tōkyō: Heibonsha. p. 3.

Beginning with Hans Poelzig’s Grosses Schauspielhaus in Berlin, Architectural Apocalypse documents the final days of historic early-twentieth-century buildings, traces of the past that had been deemed inefficient, out of place, and unnecessary in the globalizing metropolis. Miyamoto pictures them individually with a focus on the material decomposition of the structure. The buildings that Miyamoto photographed in the midst of their demolition represent a range of industries geared towards popular entertainment, such as cinemas, breweries, department stores, and the remnants of international expos. Hayashi describes these buildings as “significant gathering places for the masses in the modern city, spaces of pleasure where they enjoyed themselves while dreaming utopian dreams.”

In 1988, Miyamoto compiled his images of “temporary ruins” into a photobook provocatively entitled Kenchiku no mokushiroku (Architectural Apocalypse). In 1988, Miyamoto received the Kimura Ihei Award for Architectural Apocalypse, and since 1986 these photographs have been featured in more than fifty individual and group exhibitions. The images were published in architectural journals such as SD (Space + Design), Toshi Jūtaku, and Shitsunai at the same time that they were appearing in the journals Asahi Graph and Bijutsu Techō. The photobook was republished in 2003 with additional images, and it was a centerpiece of Miyamoto’s 2004 retrospective exhibition at the Setagaya Art Museum in Tokyo.

== Kowloon Walled City ==
In 1973, Miyamoto and the editorial staff of the Toshi Jūtaku conducted a survey on the construction of Motomachi High-Rise Apartments. Miyamoto was marked on this occasion by the poor housing area of Motomachi - known as the "genbaku slum" - a consequence of the temporary barracks construction after the 1945 atomic bomb. Miyamoto describes working on projects such as this as a revelatory time in his early career: “It was the first time I looked at and paid attention to certain things, such as housing and architecture and different ways of living.”

On January 14, 1987, the government of Hong Kong made the official announcement that Kowloon Walled City, the notorious 2.7-hectare slum on Kowloon Island, would be demolished and the land turned into a park before the sovereignty of the territory will be transferred to China. Miyamoto decided to visit Hong Kong in May of that year. He spent his first day photographing only the exterior of the Walled City. On his second day, Miyamoto hired a local guide and entered the city.

The maze-like streets that discharge sewage are like a medieval city. Or, it is the chaotic street corners covered in acid rain from the movie Blade Runner, which is said to depict the most realistic prediction of the future city.

— Ryūji Miyamoto, “Monokurōmu no sekai Kyūryū jōsai, kyokugen no kōsō suramu” (The Monochrome World of Kowloon Walled City, The Limits of the High-Rise Slum), Jūtaku kenchiku 155 (February 1988), 40.

Most of the photographs that Miyamoto initially published of Kowloon are made up of these alleyways, revealing perspectives and sightlines that are continually cut off by the circuitous routes that delineate the Walled City. He also photographed the conglomeration of cramped apartments, the illegal cages terraces, signboards, dentists offices and the informal networks of cables and pipes.

When Miyamoto returned to photograph Kowloon again in the fall of 1987, he paid for a helicopter to take him above the Walled City so that he could capture birds-eye-views of the fortification.

He published his first photobook on Kowloon Walled City in 1988, at Atelier Peyotl. When eventually its demolition was completed in 1994, Kowloon Walled City no longer existed as a reality. Miyamoto’s photographs continue to be an effective resource in its documentation; hence, the republication of the Kowloon Walled City photobook in 1997, 2009, and again in 2017.

== Cardboard Houses ==
Alongside with Miyamoto's project on Kowloon Walled City, the Cardboard Houses project is another instance of what he calls “handmade architecture” (tezukuri kenchiku).

After his own first sighting of cardboard houses in 1983, under a bridge near the Tsukiji fish market in Tokyo, Miyamoto began to photograph the so-called "homeless" houses, that have sprung up around Tokyo and in major Japanese cities. He defined these cardboard houses as archetypal human dwellings, made by "hunter-gathers" of the contemporary city :

Tacked together out of scavenged refuse materials commonly discarded in all big cities cardboard boxes, scraps of wood, polystyrene packs, mattresses, plastic tarps, umbrellas these dwellings attest to the consummate skill of their builders, persons alienated from both society and family working today in exactly the same mode as humans in primeaeval times who gathered their own materials to build their own shelters in the wild. These « homeless » cardboard houses are the product of earnest efforts to utilise empty urban spaces. Existing within the contemporary city whose every spatial assignation is determined by economics and politics, they stand wholly apart from considerations of efficiency and power. Each individual cardboard house has a presence like a wedge driven singlehandedly into the urban mass, exposing diverse contradictions and social issues therein.

— Ryūji Miyamoto, "Urban Hunter-Gatherer Lairs", Ryūji Miyamoto, Cardboard Houses, Kobe : Bearlin, 2003

In 1990, he exhibited a work entitled “Tokyo’s Cardboard Houses” (Tokyo no danbōru no ie) in the group show “TOKYO,” organized by Itō Toshiharu at the Yurakuchō Seibu Art Forum. For the show, he compiled nearly 1-ton of cardboard to create four square mounds to which he attached his photographs of cardboard houses.

Miyamoto continued photographing the homes of the homeless for another nine years, and, in 2003, he published the images in a photobook plainly titled Cardboard Houses. The photographs presented in the book are from several surveys, in different regions of the world and photographed over several years: Tokyo (1983, 1984, 1988, 1994, 1995, 1996), New York (1991), Hong Kong (1993), Kawasaki (1994), Osaka (1994), London (1994) and Paris (1995).

In light of Miyamoto’s simultaneous engagement with “temporary ruins” at demolition sites, many art critics and curators in Japan have been quick to drawn a connection between the cardboard houses and ruined landscapes. Sakai Tadayasu suggests that cardboard houses actually “begin their life as ‘ruins’,” while Hayashi Yōji calls them “the ruins of consumer culture.”

Inspired by his encounters with cardboard houses, in 2000, Miyamoto created his own small wooden box – a pinhole house (pinhōru no ie) – from which to view and photograph the urbanscape :

“While photographing the cardboard houses, I was allowed to go inside them. When I did so, I felt strangely at home…. The architect Hara Hiroshi uses the phrase ‘burying the city.’ It stayed in my mind, and when I entered the houses, it immediately occurred to me that I should bury the surrounding scenery in the house.”

— Ryūji Miyamoto, “Judō to shite no shashin ‘pinhōru no ie’ igo” (Passive Photography: The ‘Pinhole House’ from Here on Out), in Kioku hyōgen ron (On the Representation of Memory), edited by Kasahara Kazuto and Terada Masahiro, p.116. Kyoto: Shōwado, 2009.

When he first began using the pinhole house to create photographs, Miyamoto went to places where he had seen cardboard houses, such as Shinjuku and Akihabara in the middle of Tokyo. He “wanted to see those places from the perspective of the house, from the perspective of those who lived inside.”

Miyamoto has used exhibitions to convey the material dimensions of the pinhole house to viewers. In an exhibition at Akiyama Gallery in Tokyo in 2000, he constructed six pinhole houses and displayed the photographs inside the structures as they would have appeared at the time of their creation.

== KOBE 1995 After The Earthquake ==
In the first few days after the Great Hanshin-Awaji earthquake, Miyamoto was encouraged by an acquaintance in publishing, Suzuki Akira, to journey to the disaster zone and photograph the city of Kobe. The center of the city is where the greatest loss of life, buildings and infrastructure occurred. Miyamoto visited Kobe ten days after the earthquake struck. As Miyamoto quickly realized, these ruins were not the same material that he had dealt with at demolition sites :

Demolition is an activity planned by humans that takes place in one corner of the city. But the earthquake blew away such things at once. What is more, it was not just a corner, but the entire city was destroyed. Walking around and around, the rubble went on. To be honest, I didn't know how to photograph it.

— Ryūji Miyamoto, Shashinka Miyamoto Ryūji-san / Shinsai chokugo no sanjō kiroku / ‘Chinmoku no hūkei’ ni atara na imi sagaru / Kaigai de takai hyōka ima, hisaichi ni tou” (Photographer Miyamoto Ryūji / Documentation of the Disastrous Scene Immediately Following the Earthquake / Groping for New Meaning in a ‘Silent Landscape’ / Questioning the Affected Area Now with His Overseas Reputation), Asahin shinbun (June 19, 2004), p.2.

Determined to maintain his photographic style even in the face of a disaster area, he employed the same methods that he had used to photograph demolition sites, cardboard houses, and Kowloon. He traversed the city with a large-format 4x5 camera and set up his tripod to photograph the exteriors of buildings, streets filled with debris, and overturned trains in an attempt to create a “total survey” (maru de sokuryō) of the disaster. If ruins in various forms are the theme of KOBE 1995, the photographs are organized in several typologies : major public buildings, main department stores (Chuo and Sannomiya districts), backstreets (Sannomiya), railways, residential areas (Nagata, Suma, Nada). The final photograph is a two-page spread of a temporary refugee housing.

According to Miyamoto, just one year after the earthquake Kobe “had really been cleaned up and any traces of the disaster were miraculously gone.” For him, “This is the power of photographs – that you can still try and convey what it was like to people who did not have direct contact with the scene.”

Miyamoto's photographs of Kobe were exhibited in the Japan Pavilion at the Sixth Venice Biennale of Architecture in 1996, entitled Fractures with Arata Isozaki as curator and Katsuhiro Miyamoto and Osamu Ishiyama as architects-scenographers. For this "work of memory", carried out after the Kobe earthquake of January 1995, nearly twenty tons of rubble - fragments of materials and remains of the destruction - were specially transported from Kobe - and exhibited in the Pavilion. Twenty-two of Miyamoto Ryūji’s photographs of Kobe after the earthquake were printed up into 5 x 1.2-meter murals that covered the walls, enclosing the space. In an interview on the exhibition, Miyamoto confessed, “I didn’t want it to be pretty. I just wanted to line the photos up on the wall. […] The photos are themselves ruins on paper.” Thus, the edges of some the murals were ripped or burnt to imitate the aesthetic of the ruin. Miyamoto preserved the murals that he created for Fractures, and when he exhibits them, for example at the exhibition at the Centre Pompidou-Metz in France, “Japan-ness: Architecture and Urbanism in Japan since 1945” (2017), he continues to emphasize the decaying materiality of the work.

== 3.11 TSUNAMI 2011 ==
In 2011 and 2012, Miyamoto produced a documentary film titled 3.11 TSUNAMI 2011 that he co-authored with three survivors of the Great East Japan Earthquake and Tsunami of March 2011. In this case, Miyamoto elected not to photograph the ruins of Tōhoku (Northeast Japan). Instead he shifted his focus from the architectural and infrastructural effects of disaster to the human experience of it. Miyamoto claimed that he “didn't know how to photograph” Kobe after the earthquake, but he still persisted in attempting to come to some understanding of the events that had occurred there. In the wake of 3/11, not only did he not know how to photograph the Tōhoku region; he found himself unable to do so.

The film is made up of three parts. Each section begins with approximately 15-minutes of completely unedited footage of the tsunami followed by a 15-minute interview with the survivor who filmed it.

Miyamoto’s reserved and indirect approach to the events of 3/11 articulates a more nuanced understanding of the knowability of traumatic experiences. Taking the “obscenity of understanding” as a given, Miyamoto resorted to the “act of transmitting,” rather than documenting, one component of the triple disaster of 3/11. He also refuses to qualify this film as "art".

== Exhibitions (selection) ==
2018

Catastrophe and the Power of Art, Mori Art Museum, Tokyo, Japan

Tokyoscape: Into the City, Setagaya Art Museum, Tokyo, Japan

2017

Japan-ness, Center Pompidou-Metz, Metz, France

2013

“Making as Living” The Exhibition of Great East Japan Earthquake Regeneration Support Action Project, Design and creative center, Kobe, Hyogo, and 3331 Arts Chiyoda, Tokyo, Japan

2007

The Sense of Collapse, The National Museum of Modern Art, Tokyo, Japan

Gazing at the Contemporary World: Japanese Photography from the 1970s to the Present, Japan Foundation

2004

Ryuji Miyamoto Retrospective, Setagaya Art Museum, Tokyo, Japan

1999

Cities on the Move, Hayward Gallery, London

KOBE 1995 After The Earthquake, Museum für Moderne Kunst, Frankfurt, Germany

1998

Invisible Cities, Hong Kong Arts Center, Hong Kong

Ryuji Miyamoto, Centre national de la Photographie, Paris, France

1994

Liquid Crystal Futures, The Fruitmarket Gallery, Edinburgh, UK and Spiral Garden, Tokyo

1992

My Home Sweet Home in Ruins; The Urban Environment and Art in Japan, Setagaya Art Museum, Tokyo

1986

Architectural Apocalypse, Hillside Gallery, Tokyo, Japan

== Collections ==
- Setagaya Art Museum, Tokyo, Japan
- San Francisco Museum of Modern Art, San Francisco, USA
- The J. Paul Getty Museum, Los Angeles, USA
- Museum of Fine Arts, Houston, USA
- Museum für Moderne Kunst, Frankfurt, Germany
- Tokyo Photographic Art Museum, Tokyo, Japan
- National Museum of Modern Art, Tokyo, Japan
- Mori Art Museum, Tokyo, Japan
- The National Museum of Art, Osaka, Japan
- Japan Foundation
- Fukutake Foundation, Kagawa, Japan
- Maison Européenne de La Photographie, Paris, France
- Centre Pompidou, Paris, France
- Hamburger Kunsthalle, Hamburg, Germany
- Deutsches Centrum für Photographie, Berlin, Germany
- Museum Folkwang, Essen, Germany
- Hong Kong Arts Centre, Hong Kong, China

== Awards ==
2012

Awarded Medal of Honor with Purple Ribbon, “Shiju Hosho”

2005

The Minister of Education's 55th Art Encouragement Prize

The 12th Awards for the Promotion of Japanese Arts and Culture

1999

The 11th Shashin-no-Kai Prize

1996

Leone d'oro for the Best National Pavilion Venice Biennale: 6th International Architecture Exhibition

1989

The 14th Kimura Ihei Memorial Photography Award

== Publications ==
Kubikukuri Takuzou, Kanagawa, BankART1929, 2018

Kowloon Walled City, Tokyo: Sairyusha, 2017

KOBE 1995: The Earthquake Revisited, Hyogo: BEARLIN, 2006

Architectural Apocalypse, Tokyo: Heibonsha, 2003

CARDBOARD HOUSES, Hyogo: BEARLIN, 2003

Ryuji Miyamoto, Göttingen: Steidl Publishers, 1999

Kowloon Walled City, Tokyo: Heibonsha, 1997

Kobe 1995 After the Earthquake, Tokyo: Telescope / Workshop for Architecture and Urbanism, 1995

Angkor, Tokyo: Treville, 1994

Kau Lung Shing Chai (Kowloon Walled City), Tokyo: Atelier Peyotl, 1988

Architectural Apocalypse, Tokyo: Heibonsha, 1988

== Bibliography ==
- Cushman, Carrie. Temporary Ruins: Miyamoto Ryūji's Architectural Photography in Postmodern Japan (Thesis). Columbia University. 2018.
- Setting sun : writings by Japanese photographers. Ivan Vartanian, Akihiro Hatanaka, Yutaka Kambayashi, 章宏 畑中. New York: Aperture. 2006.
- Miyamoto Ryūji shashinten: Kowareyuku mono umareizuru mono (Ryūji Miyamoto Retrospective), edited by Miyamoto Ryūji and Endo Nozomi, translated by Stanley N. Anderson. Tokyo: Setagaya Bijutsukan, 2004.
