= Camera Mainichi =

Japanese photography magazine

Camera Mainichi (カメラ毎日, Kamera mainichi) is a Japanese monthly magazine of photography that started in June 1954 and ceased publication in April 1985. The Mainichi Press was the founding company. Robert Capa was instrumental in the establishment of the magazine.

As in most mass-market photography magazines, much of the editorial content of Camera Mainichi was devoted to news and reviews of cameras, lenses, and other equipment. But from the start it found space for first-rate and unconventional photography, and especially during the period 1963–78 when it was edited by Shōji Yamagishi it seemed more adventurous than its major rivals Asahi Camera and Nippon Camera (which both survived it). After Yamagishi left, it devoted more space to fashion and mildly erotic photography.

Camera Mainichi was based in Tokyo. The last editor of the magazine was Kazuo Nishii.

The magazine also published the results of two photo contests sponsored by Mainichi Shinbun-sha: the Mainichi photography award (1955–58) and the Domon Ken Award (from 1982).

Although mainichi literally means "daily", the magazine was instead named after its publisher, Mainichi Shinbun-sha (best known for its daily newspaper Mainichi Shinbun).
