= Issei Suda =

Japanese photographer (1940–2019)

Issei Suda (須田 一政, Suda Issei) (24 April 1940 – 7 March 2019) was a Japanese photographer who "[combined] a pure appreciation of Japanese customs with a sharp investigative eye".

== Life and career ==
Born Kazumasa Suda (須田 一政 Suda Kazumasa) in Kanda, Tokyo on 24 April 1940, Suda dropped out of Toyo University in 1961 and entered Tokyo College of Photography, from which he graduated in 1962.

From 1967 to 1971, Suda worked as the cameraman of the theatrical group Tenjō Sajiki, under Shūji Terayama. He worked as a freelance photographer from 1971. His first photobook, Fūshi kaden, was named after a treatise by Zeami Motokiyo; it won a Photographic Society of Japan newcomer's award in 1976. His fourth, Ningen no kioku, won the Domon Ken Award in 2014.

Suda was a professor at Osaka University of Arts.

He died at the age of 78 on 7 March 2019.

== Books by Suda ==
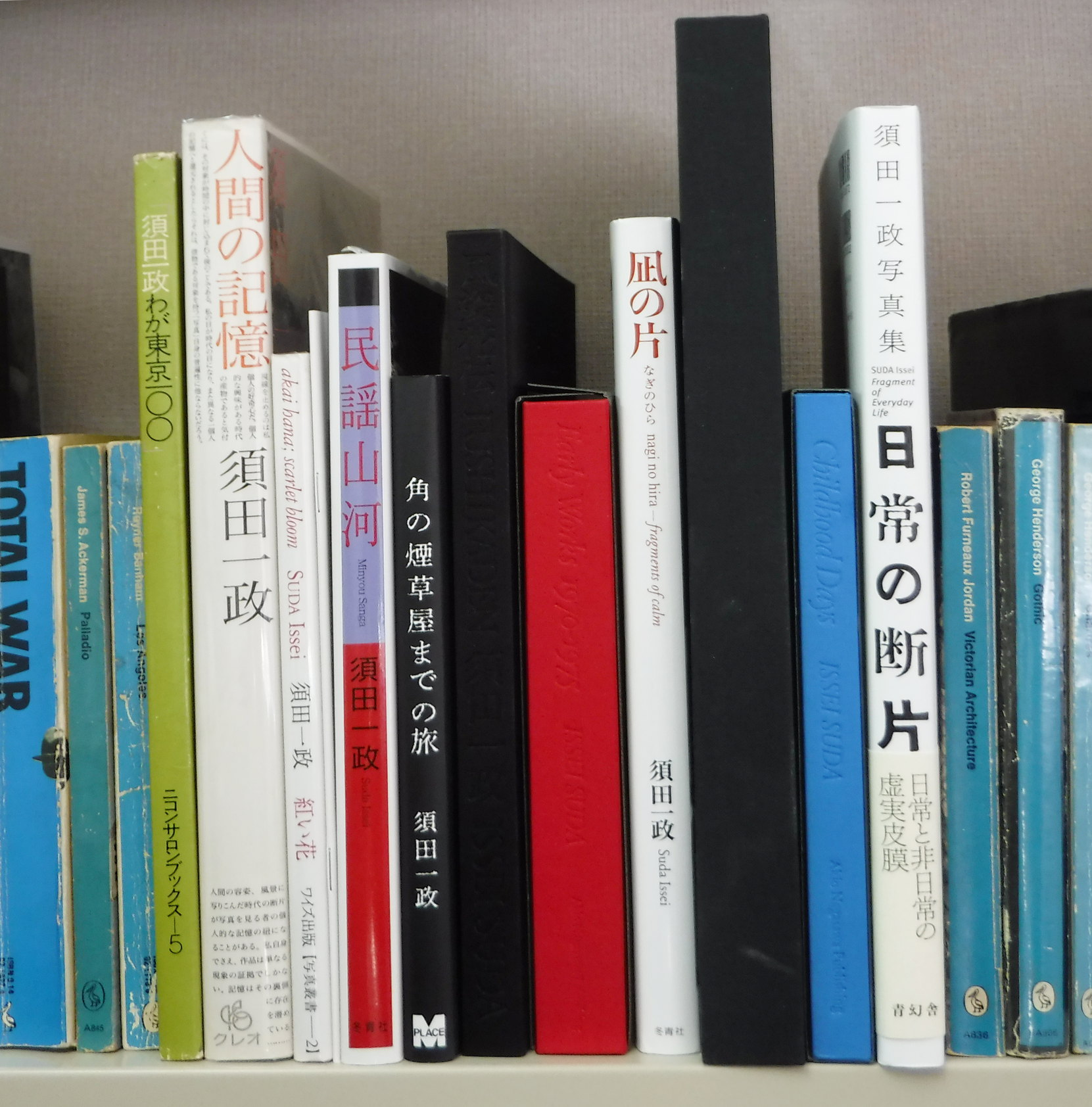
Some photobooks by Suda, left to right: Waga-Tōkyō hyaku (1979), Ningen no kioku, Akai hana, Fūshi kaden (JCII Photo Salon library), Min'yō sanga, Kado no tabakoya made no tabi, Fushikaden (2012), Early Works 1970–1975, Fragments of Calm, Tokyokei, Childhood Days, Fragment of Everyday Life . . . flanked by irrelevant Pelicans

- Fūshi kaden (風姿花伝). Sonorama Shashin Sensho 16. Tokyo: Asahi Sonorama, 1978. NCID BN04412945.
- Waga-Tōkyō hyaku (わが東京100). Nikon Salon Books 5. Tokyo: Nikkor Club, 1979. NCID BA50716008.
- Inu no hana: Kimagure, shashin, sanpo (犬の鼻：気紛れ・写真・散歩). Tokyo: IBC, 1991. ISBN 4-87198-849-X.
- Ningen no kioku (人間の記憶). Tokyo: Creo, 1996. ISBN 4-87736-001-8.
- Akai hana (紅い花). Tokyo: Wides, 2000. ISBN 4-89830-030-8. Early photographs.
- Suda Issei shashinten "Fūshi kaden" (須田一政作品展「風姿花伝」). JCII Photo Salon library 165. Tokyo: JCII, 2005.
- Min'yō sanga (民謡山河). Tokyo: Tōseisha, 2007. ISBN 978-4-88773-077-9.
- Kado no tabakoya made no tabi (角の煙草屋までの旅). Tokyo: Place M, 2011. ISBN 4905360005.
- The Work of a Lifetime: Photographs 1968–2006. Berlin: Only Photography, 2011. ISBN 978-3-9812537-5-7.
- Fūshi kaden (風姿花伝) = Fushikaden. Tokyo: Akio Nagasawa, 2012. NCID BB29473912. (Note: Akio Nagasawa's page about Fushikaden, as of 8 January 2016.)
- Rubber. Tokyo: M-Books, 2012. ISBN 978-4-905360-03-2. Photographs of rubber fetishism.
- Sen-kyūhyaku-nanajūgo Miura Misaki (一九七五 三浦三崎) = 1975 Miuramisaki. Tokyo: Akio Nagasawa, 2012. NCID BB29471917. (Note: Akio Nagasawa's page about 1975 Miuramisaki, as of 8 January 2016.)
- Sparrow Island. Portland: Nazraeli, 2012. ISBN 9781590053652. Photographs of Suzumejima (雀島), an islet (35.0894°N 140.1016°E) in Chiba.
- 松之物語 = Monogatari of Pines. Taiwan: 亦安工作室, 2013. ISBN 9789868857353.
- Mumei no danjo: Tōkyō 1976–8 (無名の男女 東京 1976–8). Tokyo: Akio Nagasawa, 2013. 48 pages; edition of 50 copies. NCID BB29473005
- Early Works 1970–1975. Tokyo: Akio Nagasawa, 2013. NCID BB29473719. (Note: Akio Nagasawa's page about one of five cover variants of Early Works, as of 8 January 2016.)
- Nagi no hira (凪の片) = Fragments of Calm. Tokyo: Tōseisha, 2013. ISBN 978-4-88773-145-5.
- Tōkyō-kei (東京景) = Tokyokei. Tokyo: Zen Foto Gallery, 2013. ISBN 978-4-905453-30-7 (Note: Zen Foto Gallery's page about Tokyokei.)
- Waga-Tōkyō hyaku (わが東京100) = Waga Tokyo 100. Tokyo: Zen Foto Gallery, 2013. ISBN 978-4-905453-31-4. (Note: Zen Foto Gallery's page about Waga Tokyo 100.)
- Osorezan e (恐山へ) = The Journey to Osorezan. Tokyo: Zen Foto Gallery, 2013. ISBN 978-4-905453-32-1. Photographs of Osorezan. (Note: Zen Foto Gallery's page about The Journey to Osorezan.)
- Sōmatō no yō ni: Kamagasaki 2000/2014 (走馬灯のように 釜ケ崎2000・2014) = Kamagasaki Magic Lantern. Tokyo: Zen Foto Gallery, 2015. NCID BB2084196X. Photographs of Kamagasaki, Osaka. (Note: Zen Foto Gallery's page about Kamagasaki Magic Lantern.)
- Childhood Days. Tokyo: Akio Nagasawa, 2015. NCID BB1976743X. (Note: Akio Nagasawa's page about one of two cover variants of Childhood Days, as of 8 January 2016.)
- Rei. Tokyo: Akio Nagasawa, 2015. NCID BB19854614. Photographs of mannequins. (Note: Akio Nagasawa's page about Rei, as of 1 March 2016.)
- Bōsō fūdoki (房総風土記). Kamakura: Super Labo, 2015. ISBN 978-4-905052-88-3. Photographs of Bōsō.
- Suda Issei shashinten "Min'yō sanga" (須田一政作品展「民謡山河」). JCII Photo Salon library 294. Tokyo: JCII, 2016. NCID BB20279502.
- Suddenly. Tokyo: Place M, 2016. ISBN 978-4-905360-14-8.
- Sein. Kamakura: Super Labo, 2017. ISBN 9784908512032.
- Kannagara (かんながら) = Kan-nagara. Tokyo: Place M, 2017. ISBN 978-4-905360-17-9.
- Nichijō no danpen (日常の断片) = Fragment of Everyday Life. Kyoto: Seigensha, 2018. ISBN 978-4-86152-657-2.
- Mōmaku chokketsu yubisaki me kamera (網膜直結指先目カメラ) = The Mechanical Retina on My Fingertips. Tokyo: Zen Foto Gallery, 2018. NCID BB27686209. Text in Japanese, English and Chinese. (Note: Zen Foto Gallery's page about The Mechanical Retina at My Fingertips.)
- Gankotoshi. Tokyo: Akio Nagasawa, 2019. NCID BB29498775.
- Entotsu no aru fūkei (煙突のある風景). Tokyo: Place M, 2019. ISBN 978-4-905360-26-1.
- Tokyo Modern Pictorial. Tokyo: Zen Foto Gallery, 2020. ISBN 978-4-905453-92-5. (Note: Zen Foto Gallery's page about Tokyo Modern Pictorial.)
- 78. Paris: Chose Commune, 2020. ISBN 979-10-96383-16-0. (Note: Chose Commune's page about 78.)
- New Life. Tokyo: Akio Nagasawa, 2020. NCID BC06174454.
- Eden. Tokyo: Place M, 2020. ISBN 978-4-905360-32-2.
- My Japan. Amsterdam: Fw, 2021. Edited by Anne Ruygt. ISBN 9789490119959. With an essay by Frits Gierstberg.
- Mumei no danjo (無名の男女 = Anonymous Man and Woman. Tokyo: Akio Nagasawa, 2021. 100 photographs from the series made in the late 1970s. 160 pages; edition of 600 copies.
- Fūshi kaden (風姿花伝) = Exhibition Fushikaden. Ningbo: Jiazazhi, 2020. 71 photographs on 72 pages.
- Family Diary = Kazoku nikki (家族日記). Marseille: Chose Commune, 2021. ISBN 979-10-96383-26-9. With text in French, English and Japanese. (Note: Chose Commune's page about Family Diary.)
- Kantō fūtan (関東風譚) = The Sketch of Kanto Area. Tokyo: Akio Nagasawa, 2022. Edition of 600 copies. 120 pages. Hardcover, 207mm × 216mm.
- Holy Night. Marseille: Chose Commune, 2022. ISBN 979-10-96383-36-8. With text in French, English and Japanese. (Note: Chose Commune's page about Holy Night.)
- Monogusa shui (物草拾遺) = Monogusa Shui. Tokyo: Akio Nagasawa, 2023. Edition of 600 copies. 84 pages, 61 monochrome images (photographed 1976–1982, mostly in Tokyo). Hardcover, 207mm × 216mm.

== General references ==
- (in Japanese) Suda Issei (須田一政) / Issei Suda. Nihon no Shashinka 40. Tokyo: Iwanami, 1998. ISBN 4-00-008380-5.
