= Akihide Tamura =

Japanese photographer

Akihide Tamura (田村 彰英, Tamura Akihide) is a Japanese photographer. He was born in Tokyo on 13 March 1947 as Shigeru Tamura (田村 茂, Tamura Shigeru). He studied at Tokyo College of Photography, graduating first in 1967 and then from a more advanced course two years later.

Tamura's first solo exhibition — under the name Shigeru Tamura (田村 シゲル) — was Yume no hikari (Dream light) in Ginza Nikon Salon in 1969. He became known for his somewhat harsh monochrome depictions of landscapes. In 1974 his works appeared within the "New Japanese Photography" show in the Museum of Modern Art, New York.

Tamura made the stills for several of the late films of Akira Kurosawa, and has published a book of photographs taken on the sets of Kurosawa's films.

== Books by Tamura ==
- Tamura Photographs (1983)
- Base. Tokyo: Mole, 1992. ISBN 4-938628-07-4.
- Kurosawa Akira (黒澤明, Akira Kurosawa). Tokyo: NTT, 1991. ISBN 4-87188-119-9. (in French and Japanese)

== Sources and external links ==
- (in Japanese) Tamura Photographs
- (in Japanese) Nihon shashinka jiten (日本写真家事典, 328 Outstanding Japanese Photographers). Kyoto: Tankōsha, 2000. ISBN 4-473-01750-8.
