= List of Japanese women photographers =

This is a list of women photographers who were born in Japan or whose works are closely associated with that country.

== A ==
- Emi Anrakuji (born 1963), legally blind photographer known for her portraits

== F ==
- Shiho Fukada (fl 2000s), photojournalist

== H ==
- Mikiko Hara (born 1967), colour snapshots of people or things in everyday life, often causing feelings of levity or foreboding, people in public spaces
- Hiromix (born 1976), life from a teenager's perspective and photo books on identity, community, gender and the everyday

== I ==
- Hisae Imai (1931–2009), specialized in the photography of horses
- Ariko Inaoka (active since 1998), photographer
- Miyako Ishiuchi (born 1947), contrasty prints including close-ups of the very old, grainy-blurry works, close-ups of the elderly

== K ==
- Miho Kajioka (born 1973)
- Mari Katayama (born 1987), self-portraits with textile sculptures
- Rinko Kawauchi (born 1972), serene, poetic style, ordinary moments in life
- Aya Kida (born 1974), photographer, winner of the Kimura Ihei Award
- Fusako Kodama (born 1945), depicted Japan as a nation of high technology, and life in Tokyo
- Michiko Kon (born 1955), new approach to mainly black-and-white still lifes with images of everything from toothbrushes to timepieces and fish parts black and white prints, sea creatures
- Yasuko Kotani (born 1962), photographer

== M ==
- Miyuki Matsuda (born 1961), actor who has published photography of nudes
- Michiko Matsumoto (born 1950), portraits of artists and dancers living in various countries
- Tomoko Miyamoto (born 1960), photographer

== N ==
- Yurie Nagashima (born 1973), portraits, including portraits of herself and her family in the nude, street photography, still lifes
- Mika Ninagawa (born 1972), brightly coloured photographs of flowers, goldfish and landscapes, commercially successful in fashion and advertising
- Rika Noguchi (born 1971), landscape photographer, artistic photographer, based in Berlin

== O ==
- Yoshino Ōishi (born 1944), widely travelled photojournalist, educator
- Yuki Onodera (born 1962), images of everyday objects such as old clothes, tin cans, birds, houses shining in the darkness, and human figures, living in France
- Kei Orihara (born 1948), documentary and portrait photographer, has published books on life in New York, and books for children about the disabled, interior portraits, photobooks for children

== S ==
- Tsuneko Sasamoto (1914–2022), Japan's first female photojournalist, has photographed some of the country's greatest personalities and historic moments
- Tomoko Sawada (born 1977), feminist photographer, performance artist
- Shima Ryū (1823–1899), earliest known Japanese woman photographer, photographed her husband in 1864, later opened a studio in Kiryū
- Mieko Shiomi (1909–1984), abstraction and realism, known for her monochrome compositions
- Kunié Sugiura (born 1942), creator of photograms, based in New York City
- Ryoko Suzuki (born 1970), photographic artist

== T ==
- Cozue Takagi (born 1985), creator of montages
- Toyoko Tokiwa (1928–2019), best known for her depiction of the red-light district of post-occupation Yokohama, for a clientele of US servicemen
- Tokuko Ushioda (born 1940), widely exhibited freelance photographer

== W ==
- Hitomi Watanabe (渡辺 眸 Watanabe Hitomi, born 1939)

== Y ==
- Eiko Yamazawa (1899–1995), portrait photographer and founder of a photography school, owns a studio
- Miwa Yanagi (born 1967), staged events with women of various ages, frequently using the computer to alter the image in strange ways, several published series including Elevator Girls
- Shizuka Yokomizo (born 1966), photographer and installation artist based in London
- Ruiko Yoshida (born 1938), published several photobooks designed to fight against discrimination towards the poor and blacks, best known for Harlem Black Angels

== See also ==
- List of women photographers
