= Higashikawa Prize =

Japanese photography award

The Higashikawa Prize (東川賞, Higashikawa-shõ) has been awarded to photographers by the "Phototown" of Higashikawa, Hokkaidō, Japan since 1985. The Overseas and Domestic Photographer prizes are of 500,000 yen and the New Photographer and Special prizes are of 300,000 yen.

The work of twenty years' winners of the Overseas Photographer Prize was exhibited in the Tokyo Metropolitan Museum of Photography in 2006.

| No. | Year | Overseas Photographer Prize | Domestic Photographer Prize | New Photographer Prize | Special Prize |
|---|---|---|---|---|---|
| 1 | 1985 | Joel Sternfeld | Issei Suda, Keiichi Tahara | [none] | Yoshihiko Shiga |
| 2 | 1986 | Lucien Clergue | Kishin Shinoyama | Takanobu Hayashi | Tetsuya Sekiguchi |
| 3 | 1987 | Joel Meyerowitz | Ikkō Narahara | Michiko Kon | Kōji Kanbe |
| 4 | 1988 | Lewis Baltz | Shōji Ueda | Eiji Ina | Minoru Taketazu |
| 5 | 1989 | Shi Shaohua | Yūkichi Watabe | Jun Tsukida | Masahide Satō |
| 6 | 1990 | Graciela Iturbide | Osamu Murai | Tokihiro Satō | Kazumi Kurigami |
| 7 | 1991 | Jan Saudek | Nobuyoshi Araki | Takako Minoda | Gen'ichirō Kakegawa |
| 8 | 1992 | Olivo Barbieri | Jōji Hashiguchi | Seiichi Furuya | Masahisa Fukase |
| 9 | 1993 | William Yang | Yutaka Takanashi | Kō Inose | Takeo Shimizu |
| 10 | 1994 | Michel Campeau | Taku Aramasa | Mitsuhiko Imamori | Hiromi Nagakura |
| 11 | 1995 | Kim Soo-Nam | Hiroshi Sugimoto | Masato Seto | Tsuneo Hayashida |
| 12 | 1996 | Gundula Schulze el Dowy | Kikuji Kawada | Taiji Matsue | Ikuo Nakamura |
| 13 | 1997 | Calum Colvin | Kazuyoshi Machino | Osamu Kanemura | Ryōichi Satō |
| 14 | 1998 | Anthony Hernandez | Hiroshi Suga | Takeshi Hosokawa | Shōjun Tsuyama |
| 15 | 1999 | Claudio Edinger | Miyako Ishiuchi | Miwa Yanagi | Kunihiko Takada |
| 16 | 2000 | Chema Madoz | Naoya Hatakeyama | Keiko Nomura | Masakatsu Kubota |
| 17 | 2001 | Andrejs Grants | Eikoh Hosoe | Yuki Onodera | Kazuemon Hidano |
| 18 | 2002 | Edwin Zwakman | Yasumasa Morimura | Kōji Onaka | Kensuke Kazama |
| 19 | 2003 | Guy Tillim | Ryōichi Saitō | Kimio Itozaki | Ruiko Yoshida |
| 20 | 2004 | Antoine D'Agata | Yukio Nakagawa | Akiko Tobu | Eiichi Kurasawa |
| 21 | 2005 | Kim Nyung-man | Hotarō Koyama | Kenji Kohiyama | Ryoko Suzuki |
| 22 | 2006 | Ketaki Seth | Risaku Suzuki | Emi Anrakuji | Osamu Wataya |
| 23 | 2007 | Manit Sriwanichpoom | Kunié Sugiura | Masako Imaoka | Hiroyuki Yamada |
| 24 | 2008 | Klaus Mitteldorf | Asako Narahashi | Tomoko Sawada | Yūji Obata |
| 25 | 2009 | Anne Ferran | Toshio Shibata | Naoki Ishikawa | Keiji Tsuyuguchi |

| No. | Year | Overseas Photographer Award | Domestic Photographer Award | New Photographer Award | Special Award | Hidano Kazuemon Award |
|---|---|---|---|---|---|---|
| 26 | 2010 | Chin-pao Chen | Keizō Kitajima | Osamu James Nakagawa | Yoshihiro Hagiwara | Ichirō Kojima |
| 27 | 2011 | Peter Dressler | Yuki Onodera | Ken Kitano | Minoru Okuda | Shunji Dodo |
| 28 | 2012 | Arif Aşçı | Taiji Matsue | Lieko Shiga | Makiko Ue | Yoshikazu Minami |
| 29 | 2013 | Minstrel Kuik Ching Chieh | Rinko Kawauchi | Ari Hatsuzawa | Takehiko Nakafuji | Minoru Yamada |
| 30 | 2014 | Jorma Puranen | Rika Noguči | Gentaró Išizuka | Kódži Sakai | Tazuko Masujama |
| 31 | 2015 | Anne Noble | Tokihiro Satō | Maiko Haruki | Kazutoši Jošimura | Kikudžiró Fukušima |
| 32 | 2016 | Óscar Muñoz | Taiši Hirokawa | Jóko Ikeda | Michael Kenna | Jošimi Ikemoto |
| 33 | 2017 | Anna Orłowska | Seiiči Motohaši | Sakiko Nomura | Acuši Okada | Joširó Koseki |
| 34 | 2018 | Marian Penner Bancroft | Tokuko Ušioda | Erika Jošino | Eidži Óhaši | Keisó Tomioka |
| 35 | 2019 | Rosemary Laing | Lieko Shiga | Mari Katayama | Atsushi Okuyama | Junichi Ota |
| 36 | 2020 | Gregory Maiofis | Yuri Nagashima | Sayaka Ueara | Kentaro Takahashi | Hiroh Kikai |
