= Rinko Kawauchi =

Japanese photographer

Rinko Kawauchi HonFRPS
- Born: April 6, 1972 (age 54); Shiga, Japan
- Education: Seian University of Art and Design
- Known for: Photography
- Website: rinkokawauchi.com

Rinko Kawauchi HonFRPS (川内 倫子, Kawauchi Rinko, born 1972) is a Japanese photographer. Her work is characterized by a serene, poetic style, depicting the ordinary moments in life.

== Life and career ==
Kawauchi became interested in photography while studying graphic design and photography at Seian University of Art and Design where she graduated in 1993. She first worked in commercial photography for an advertising agency for several years before embarking on a career as a fine art photographer. She has mentioned that she continues to work the advertising job. Her background and experience with design have influenced the edits and arrangements of photos in her series. Kawauchi often thinks about new ways to see her photographs, allowing her to continue to find new meaning and significance in her work. There is little known about her personal life and family, but through her photo book Cui Cui (2005) she portrays the memories of her family, which she has said to have been shooting for over a decade. The photos in said book capture all the ordinaries and emotions of life, ranging from the happiness of childbirth to the heartbreak of death.

At age 19, she began making prints of her first black-and-white photographs, and it wasn't until five years later that she started printing color photographs. After experimenting with different cameras, she decided to stay with the Rolleiflex 6 × 6, which she still uses.

In 2001, she published simultaneously her first three photo books: Utatane ("catnap"), Hanabi ("fireworks"), and Hanako (a Japanese girl's name). In the following years she won prizes for two of the books in Japan. In 2004 Kawauchi published Aila; in 2010 Murmuration, and in 2011 Illuminance.

Kawauchi's art is rooted in Shinto, the ethnic religion of the people of Japan. According to Shinto, all things on earth have a spirit, hence no subject is too small or mundane for Kawauchi's work; she also photographs "small events glimpsed in passing," conveying a sense of the transient. Kawauchi sees her images as parts of series that allow the viewer to juxtapose images in the imagination, thereby making the photograph a work of art and allowing a whole to emerge at the end. She likes working in photo books because they allow the viewer to engage intimately with her images. Her photographs are mostly in 6 × 6 format. However, upon being invited to the Brighton Photo Biennial in 2010, Kawauchi first photographed digitally and began taking photos that were not square.

Kawauchi also composes haiku poems.

She lived for many years in Tokyo and in 2018 moved to the countryside on the outskirts of the city.

== Style ==
Since she began her photographic career, Kawauchi's photographs have worked to capture intimate and poetic moments of the world around her. They often include radiant light that produces a dream-like quality. The sublimity of her photographs are further enhanced by her use of soft colors as well as her awareness of beauty in even the most banal moments.

There is not one specific theme or concept that Kawauchi chooses to explore with her image creation; rather, she does it spontaneously, observing and reacting to everything that is around her before doing any sort of editing. She focuses on just shooting, photographing everything that attracts her eyes before looking back and thinking about why she was interested in those subjects. Another subject that she explored in her book, Ametsuchi, was the practice of religious ceremonies and rituals that hinted at an earthly cycle involving the concepts of time and impermanence. In the book, she depicts Japan's Mount Aso, a sacred site for a Shinto ritual called yakihata, and its volcanic landscape. The ritual is a long-standing tradition dating back about 1,300 years in which farmland is burned yearly to maintain its sustainability for new crops as opposed to using chemicals, and the communities at Aso are among the few that continue this tradition. Ironically, after witnessing essentially the rebirth of farmland take place, Kawauchi claims that she burned away her old self and was reborn herself.

In her book Halo, she continues to explore that theme with different rituals at other locations. She traveled to Izumo, Japan to witness a ritual that involves the lighting of sacred flames to welcome the gods. She also went to the Hebei province of China to see new year celebrations, including a 500 year old tradition of throwing molten iron at the city walls to make their own fireworks.

== Awards ==
- 1997: Grand Prix Prize, 9th Hitotsubo Exhibition, Guardian Garden, Tokyo
- 2002: 27th Kimura Ihei Award, Rookie of the Year Award, Photography Society of Japan
- 2009: Infinity Award for Art from the International Center of Photography
- 2012: Honorary Fellowship of the Royal Photographic Society
- 2013: Minister of Education Award for New Artists
- 2013: Domestic Photographer Award, Higashikawa Prize, Higashikawa, Hokkaidō, Japan

== Publications ==
=== Photo books ===
- Utatane ("Siesta"). Tokyo: Ritoru Moa (="Little More"), 2001 (reprinted 2002, 2004, 2010, 2012). ISBN 4-89815-052-7. (Japanese).
- Hanabi ("Fireworks"). Tokyo: Little More, 2001 (reprinted 2004, 2010). ISBN 4-89815-053-5 (Japanese).
- Hanako ("Catnap"). Tokyo: Little More, 2001. ISBN 4-89815-054-3 (Japanese).
- blue. Tokyo: Petit Grand 2003. ISBN 978-4-939102-43-1 (Japanese).
- Aila. Tokyo: Little More, 2004. ISBN 4-89815-116-7 (Japanese).
  - New edition: Tokyo: Foil, 2015 ISBN 978-4-902943-10-8.
- the eyes, the ears, "Photographs and Words". Tokyo: Foil, 2005 (reprinted 2007, 2010). ISBN 978-4-902943-00-9 (Japanese/English).
- Cui Cui. Tokyo: Foil, and Paris: Actes Sud/Fondation Cartier pour l'Art Contemporain, 2005. ISBN 978-2-74275525-7. Photographic memories of her family.
- Rinko Diary. Tokyo: Foil, 2006. ISBN 978-4-902943-14-6 (Japanese).
- Rinko Diary II. Tokyo: Foil, 2006. ISBN 978-4-902943-17-7 (Japanese).
- Majun Tokyo: Foil, 2007. ISBN 978-4-902943-19-1 (Japanese). Set of 10 postcards with photographs of Okinawa Churaumi Aquarium.
- Semear. Tokyo: Foil, and São Paulo: Museu de Arte Moderna (MAM), 2007. ISBN 978-4-902943-20-7 (Japanese/English/Portuguese). Photographs taken on three trips to Brazil, invited by the museum.
- Murmuration. Brighton: Photoworks, 2010. ISBN 978-1-903796-41-2. Edition of 1000 copies. First digital photographs of Brighton Pier for the Photo Biennial.
- One Day – 10 Photographers (one signed book in a set of ten individual volumes). Heidelberg/Berlin: Kehrer, 2010. ISBN 978-3-86828-173-6, edited by Harvey Benge.
- Snowflake Twelfth. (Photo-zine on 1952 novel Snowflake by Paul Gallico). Zine's Mate, 2011.
- Illuminance. Text by David Chandler, bibliography. New York: Aperture, 2011. ISBN 978-1-59711-144-7. (Simultaneous editions in Japanese, German, French and Italian: Tokyo: Foil, Heidelberg/Berlin: Kehrer, Paris: Éditions Xavier Barral, Italy: Postcart.)
  - The Tenth Anniversary Edition, expanded edition with additional texts by Masatake Shinohara and Lesley A. Martin. New York: Aperture, and London: Thames & Hudson, 2021. ISBN 978-1-59711-514-8. (Japanese edition with another cover by Torch Press.)
- Light and Shadow. Tokyo: Rinko Kawauchi Office, 2012. Pictures taken in Tōhoku region after Fukushima disaster, proceeds went to relief funds.
  - New edition: Kanagawa: Super Labo, 2014. ISBN 978-4-905052-67-8, edition of 1000 copies (Japanese/English).
- Approaching Whiteness. Tokyo: Goliga, 2013 (Japanese). Printed scroll in 9 variations of 10 to 12 images each, total combined edition of 300.
- Illuminance, Ametsuchi, Seeing Shadows. Text by Leiko Ikemura. Kyoto: Seigen-sha, 2012. ISBN 978-4-86152-348-9 (Japanese/English).
- Ametsuchi. Text by Kawauchi. New York: Aperture, 2013. ISBN 978-1-59711-216-1. (Simultaneous Japanese edition by Seigen-sha, German edition by Kehrer.)
- Sheets. Berlin: Kominek, 2013. ISBN 978-3-981510-53-9.
- with Leiko Ikemura. kirakira. Shizuoka: Nohara, 2014. ISBN 978-4-904257-25-8 (Japanese).
- with Terri Weifenbach. Gift, two books in slipcase. Tokyo: Amana, 2014. ISBN 978-4-907519-05-6.
- The river embraced me. Tokyo: Torch Press, 2016. ISBN 978-4-907562-04-5.
- Halo. New York: Aperture, 2017. ISBN 978-1-59711-411-0. (Simultaneous Japanese and French editions: Tokyo: HeHe, Paris: Éditions Xavier Barral.)
- with Seung Woo Back. Composition No. 1. Japan: Iann, 2017. ISBN 979-11-85374-16-1 (Japanese/Korean/English). Mobile phone photographs by both and conversations recorded for about 100 days.
- Hajimari no hi ("A New Day"). Japan: Kyuryudo, 2018. ISBN 978-4-7630-1809-0 (Japanese). Words and pictures in the format of a children's picture-book.
- When I was seven. Tokyo: HeHe, 2019. ISBN 978-4-908062-29-2. For French fashion brand agnès b.
- As It Is. Marseille, France: Chose Commune, 2020. ISBN 979-10-96383-17-7 (French/English). (Simultaneous Japanese edition by Torch Press.)
- Sonnafuu ("Like that"). Photographs and texts. Japan: Nanarokusha, 2020. ISBN 978-4-904292-98-3 (Japanese).
- Early Works 1997, mini portfolio (205 × 258 mm) with 6 color collotype prints. Japan: Benrido, 2021.
- Des Oiseaux (On Birds). Text by ornithologist Guilhem Lesaffre. Paris: Éditions Xavier Barral, 2021. ISBN 978-2-36511-277-2. (Simultaneous French edition.)
- M/E – On this sphere / Endlessly interlinking. Exhibition catalogue, texts by Masatake Shinohara, Hana Takigami and Yasuhiro Arai. Tokyo: Asahi Shimbun, 2022.
- Yamanami. Japan: Shinyodo, 2022. ISBN 978-4-910387-02-4.
- with Shuntarō Tanikawa. Here and Now. Tokyo: Torch Press, 2023. ISBN 978-4-907562-43-4 (Japanese/English). Poem by Tanikawa originally for music by Ikuko Harada.

== Video works ==
- 2012: Seeing Shadow (14:50 min)
- 2012: Ametsuchi (14:50 min)
- 2012: Haruarashi (Spring Storm) (5:55 min)
- 2015: Illuminance (56:26 min)
- 2017: Halo (7:07 min)

== Exhibitions ==
=== Solo exhibitions ===
- 1998: Utatane, Guardian Garden, Tokyo
- 1999: Hitoiko, Light Works, Yokohama, Japan
- 2000: Hibi, Aki-Ex Gallery, Tokyo
- 2001: Hanabi, Gray Gallery, Tokyo (book)
- 2001: Hanako, Little More Gallery, Tokyo (book)
- 2001: Utatane, Parko Gallery, Tokyo (book)
  - 2002: Collette, Paris, France
  - 2003: vonRot Gallery, Berlin, Germany
  - 2004: Cohan and Leslie, New York
- 2003: Rinko Kawauchi, 4F Gallery, Los Angeles, California
- 2003: Wacall Photo Exhibition, Spiral Garden, Tokyo
- 2004: Aila, California Museum of Photography, University of California, Riverside (book)
  - Little More Gallery, Tokyo
  - 2005: Cohan and Leslie, New York

- Kanaz Forest of Creation, Fukui, Japan

- 2004: Galerie Priska Pasquer at Paris Photo
- 2005: Cui Cui, Quarter, Florence, Italy (book)
- 2005: Aila + Cui Cui + the eyes, the ears, Fondation Cartier pour l'Art Contemporain, Paris (book: the eyes, the ears)
  - Galleria Carla Sozzani, Milan, Italy
  - 2005/06: Aila + the eyes, the ears, Fotografisk Center, Copenhagen, Denmark

- Fotografins Hus, Stockholm, Sweden
- Hasselblad Center, Gothenburg, Sweden

- 2006: Rinko Kawauchi, The Photographers' Gallery, London.
- 2006/07: Rinko Kawauchi, Galerie Priska Pasquer, Cologne, Germany (and Paris Photo)
- 2007: Rinko Kawauchi, Cohan and Leslie, New York
- 2007: Semear, Museu de Arte Moderna de São Paulo, São Paulo. (book)
  - 2008: Foil Gallery, Tokyo
- 2008: Cui Cui, Vangi Sculpture Garden Museum, Shizuoka, Japan
- 2008: Rinko Kawauchi, Antoine de Vilmorin, Paris
- 2009: Condensation, Mountain Fold Gallery, New York
- 2009: a pause, Gallery Trax, Yamanashi, Japan
- 2010: the eyes, the ears, Kunstverein Augsburg, Germany
- 2010: A Glimmer in Silence, Galerie Priska Pasquer, Cologne
- 2010: Aila, Seian University of Art and Design, Shiga, Japan
- 2010: Iridescence, Meessen de Clercq, Brussels, Belgium
- 2010: Rinko Kawauchi: Transient Wonders, Everyday Bliss – Photography, Video and Slides 2001–2009, Argos Center for Art and Media, Brussels
- 2011: Illuminance, Foil Gallery, Tokyo. (book)
  - Gallery at Hermès, NewYork
  - 2013: Christophe Guye Galerie, Zurich, Switzerland
- 2012: Light and Shadow, Traumaris Photography Space, Tokyo. (book)
- 2012: Illuminance, Ametsuchi, Seeing Shadow, Tokyo Metropolitan Museum of Photography, Tokyo.
- 2013: Ametsuchi, Aperture Gallery, New York. (book)
  - 2013/14: Galerie Priska Pasquer, Cologne. (Edition of 1000 prints of a photo from the series)
  - 2014: Main Gallery, Lesley University College of Art and Design.
- 2014: Illuminance & Ametsuchi, Fotomuseum Antwerp (in cooperation with Galerie Priska Pasquer)
- 2014: New Pictures 9: Rinko Kawauchi, Minneapolis Institute of Arts, Minneapolis.
- 2015: Illuminance, KunstHausWien, Vienna
- 2016: Museum of Contemporary Art, Kumamoto, Japan (book: The river embraced me)
- 2017: Halo, Christophe Guye Galerie, Zurich. (book)
- 2022: M/E On this sphere / Endlessly interlinking, Tokyo Opera City Art Gallery (book)
- 2023: Shiga Museum of Art
- 2024: a faraway shining star, twinkling in hand, Fotografiska Stockholm.
- 2024: a faraway shining star, twinkling in hand, Fotografiska Tallinn.
- 2024: a faraway shining star, twinkling in hand, Fotografiska Berlin.
- 2025: Rinko Kawauchi, Galerie écho 119, Paris

=== Group exhibitions ===
- 2005: Autumn 2005, Huis Marseille, Museum for Photography, Netherlands
- 2008: Creatures from the Collection and Other Themes, Huis Marseille, Museum for Photography, Netherlands
- 2008: Review/Preview – Japanese Photographs, Galerie Priska Pasquer, Cologne (with Osamu Shiihara, Shōmei Tōmatsu, Daidō Moriyama, Nobuyoshi Araki, Issei Suda, Asako Narahashi, Rinko Kawauchi, and Mika Ninagawa)
- 2010: Summer Loves, Huis Marseille, Museum for Photography, Netherlands
- 2010: Brighton Photo Biennial: New Documents, curated by Martin Parr, Brighton Museum & Art Gallery, UK. (book: Murmuration)
- 2011: Bye Bye Kitty!!! Between Heaven and Hell in Contemporary Japanese Art, curated by David Elliott, Japan Society, New York. With Kawauchi and Makoto Aida, Manabu Ikeda, Tomoko Kashiki, Haruka Kojin, Kumi Machida, Yoshitomo Nara, Kohei Nawa, Motohiko Odani, Hiraki Sawa, Chiharu Shiota, Tomoko Shioyasu, Hisashi Tenmyouya, Yamaguchi Akira, Miwa Yanagi and Tomoko Yoneda.
- 2015: In the Wake: Japanese Photographers Respond to 3/11, Museum of Fine Arts, Boston (catalogue)
- 2018: A Beautiful Moment, Huis Marseille, Museum for Photography, Netherlands
- 2026: Nusfjord x Fotografiska. An exhibition with Elizaveta Porodina in Nusfjord, Norway

== Collections ==
Kawauchi's work is held in the following collections:

- San Francisco Museum of Modern Art, San Francisco: 7 works.
- Huis Marseille, Museum for Photography, Amsterdam
- Tokyo Metropolitan Museum of Photography, Tokyo

== See also ==
- Lieko Shiga, one of Kawauchi's contemporaries
