= Tokihiro Satō =

Japanese photographer

Tokihiro Sato
- 佐藤 時啓
- Born: September 14, 1957 (age 68). Sakata, Yamagata, Japan
- Education: Tokyo National University of Fine Arts and Music
- Occupations: Photographer, educator

Tokihiro Satō (佐藤 時啓, Satō Tokihiro; born 1957) is a Japanese photographer and educator. Sato is best known for his unusual expressions of light and space and interpretations of performance and dance.

== Biography ==
Tokihiro Sato was born on September 14, 1957, in Sakata, Yamagata Prefecture, Japan. Receiving his MFA and BFA degrees in Music and Fine Arts from Tokyo National University of Fine Arts and Music in 1981, Sato was originally a trained sculptor, but decided to go with photography to better communicate his ideas.

Recognised for his playful interaction of light, Sato uses a large-format camera for exposures that last from one to three hours, while he moves around the space creating illuminated lines drawn with flashlights. The results are detailed photographs interrupted by patterns of light. And because of the long exposures, Sato's movements across the scene remain undetectable by the camera; the photograph captures his presence but not his image.

Sato's photographs are held throughout the world in public and private museums including the Solomon R. Guggenheim Museum (New York); the Los Angeles County Museum of Art; the Museum of Fine Arts, Houston; The Art Institute of Chicago; the Cleveland Museum of Art; Museum of Modern Art (Saitama, Japan); Hara Museum of Contemporary Art (Tokyo); Queensland Art Gallery (Brisbane); and Tokyo Metropolitan Museum of Photography. Solo museum exhibitions in the United States have taken place at the Cleveland Museum of Art (2003), The Art Institute of Chicago (2005), and the Frist Center for the Visual Arts in Nashville (2010).

He is currently a professor in the Inter-Media Art Department at the Tokyo University of the Arts.

== Books ==
- Tokihiro Sato: Trees, Leslie Tonkonow Artworks + Projects, New York, 2010. ISBN 978-1-4243-3017-1.
- Sato, Tokihiro. Hikari–kokyū (光―呼吸). Nikon Salon Books 24. Tokyo: Nikon, 1997.
- Sato, Tokihiro. Hikari–kokyū (光―呼吸) / Photo–Respiration. Tokyo: Bijutsu Shuppan, 1997. ISBN 4-568-12060-8.
- Sato Tokihiro no manazashi "Hikari–kokyū" (佐藤時啓のまなざし「光-呼吸」). Sakata: Sakatashi Bijutsukan, 1999.
- With 長沢秀之 and 平田五郎. Kokyū suru fūkei (呼吸する風景) / Breathing landscapes. [Urawa]: Saitama Kenritsu Kindai Bijutsukan, 1999.
- Siegel, Elizabeth. Photo Respiration: Tokihiro Sato Photographs. Chicago: The Art Institute of Chicago, 2005. ISBN 0-86559-217-9.
