= Taiji Matsue =

Japanese photographer

Taiji Matsue (松江 泰治, Matsue Taiji; born 1963) is a Japanese photographer.

== Exhibitions ==
2004: Les Rencontres d'Arles festival, France.

== Awards ==
1996

- Higashikawa Prize - New Photographer Prize (Higashikawa, Hokkaido)

2002

- The 27th Kimura Ihei Award, Asahi Shimbun Publishing Co.
