= Lieko Shiga =

Japanese photographer

Lieko Shiga (志賀理江子; born 1980) is a Japanese photographer. She is best known for her "Rasen Kaigan" (spiral coast) series.

== Career ==
Shiga was born in Okazaki, Aichi in 1980. After graduating from high school she enrolled in Tokyo Polytechnic University. She left school halfway through the term and enrolled at Chelsea College of Arts in London in 1999. She graduated in 2004. From 2007 to 2008, Shiga was part of an Agency of Cultural Affairs program for young artists that allowed her to continue studying in London. While participating in the program she published Lilly, a photograph collection of people living in her apartment building. She also won the Kimura Ihei Award for Canary, a photograph series taken in Australia and Sendai. In 2009 she won an Infinity Award from the International Center of Photography in New York City.

After returning to Japan, Shiga moved to Kitakama, Miyagi, where she partnered with a local cameraman to photograph festivals and sports days while recording oral histories with residents. While there, she and the other people who lived in Kitakama were devastated by the 2011 Tohoku earthquake and tsunami. The earthquake destroyed Shiga's studio, but more importantly it killed sixty people in the small village. Collecting over 30,000 photographs that survived the disaster, Shiga expanded them into the ‘Rasen Kaigan (Spiral Coast)’ (2008–2012) series. As she told the San Francisco Museum of Modern Art in 2018, the work consists of images from before and after the tsunami and centres on the spirit and history of the Kitakama village.

In 2012 Shiga won the Higashikawa Prize for new artists.

In 2021 Shiga received, alongside Takeuchi Kota, the Tokyo Contemporary Art Award (TCAA) 2021–2023. The Selection Committee said that her practice ‘condenses important elements for reflecting on the society in which we find ourselves, including concepts like human nature, center and periphery, death and mourning, regulation and freedom, and harmony with nature.’

== Style ==
Shiga has been compared to Rinko Kawauchi, one of her contemporaries, but her style is more expressionist. Her photographs have been called "dreamscapes" by Marco Bohr (in Time magazine), who also compared her to Masatoshi Naito. Her images are surreal and gloomy, but mostly inspired by the places around her.

== Bibliography ==
- Shiga, Lieko (2008). Lilly. アートビートパブリッシャーズ. ISBN 9784902080131.
- Shiga, Lieko (2008). Canary. 赤々舎.
- Shiga, Lieko (2013). 螺旋海岸 notebook. 赤々舎. ISBN 9784903545912.
- Shiga, Lieko (2013). 螺旋海岸 album. 赤々舎. ISBN 9784903545929.

== Collections ==
Shiga's work is held in the following permanent collections:

- Museum of Modern Art, New York City
- J. Paul Getty Museum, Los Angeles
- San Francisco Museum of Modern Art, San Francisco
