= Claudio Edinger =

Brazilian photographer

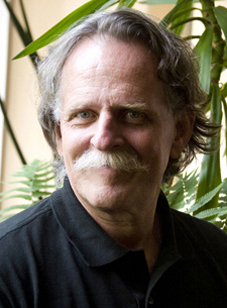
- Born: Claudio Henrique Edinger; May 3, 1952 (age 74); Rio de Janeiro, Brazil
- Education: Studied with Philippe Halsman
- Known for: Photographer, Writer, Art Director, editor, Curator
- Notable work: 29 photo books and 1 novel
- Movement: Fine Art Photography
- Spouse(s): Pamela Duffy (from 1983 to 1996), Christina Cunali (from 1996 to 2006), Betina Samaia (2013 to present)
- Children: Ana Edinger
- Awards: Leica Medal of Excellence, Ernst Haas Award, Higashikawa Award, etc.
- Website: http://www.claudioedinger.com

Claudio Edinger is a Brazilian photographer born in Rio de Janeiro in 1952. He lived in New York from 1976 to 1996.

== Biography ==
Edinger studied economics at Mackenzie University in São Paulo, Brazil. At the same time, in the beginning of the Seventies, he began taking photographs. In 1975 he had his first individual exhibition, at the São Paulo Museum of Art, with photographs of the Martinelli Building, a vertical slum in downtown São Paulo. The following year he moved to New York City and lived there until 1996.

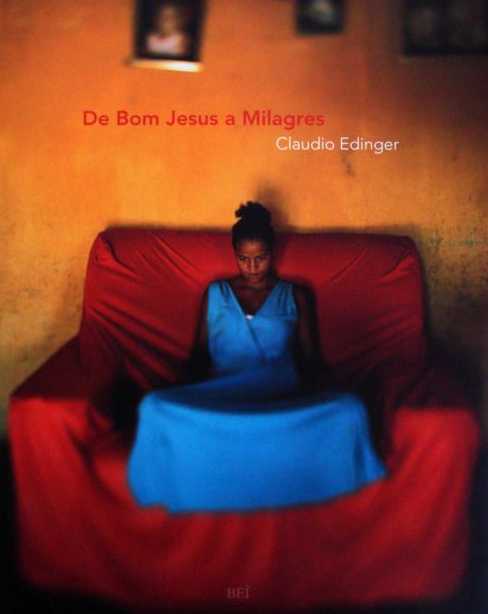
Book: De Bom Jesus a Milagres

During the time Claudio lived in New York City, he published three books: Chelsea Hotel –1983, Venice Beach –1985 both by Abbeville Press, (both received the Leica Medal of Excellence), and The Making of Ironweed, published by Viking Penguin, about the film directed by Hector Babenco, written by William Kennedy, with Meryl Streep and Jack Nicholson. In 1986 Claudio started photographing for a book about India.

In 1989 and 1990 Claudio photographed the Juqueri Psychiatric Hospital, in São Paulo, where he lived for two weeks. Madness was published by DBA, DAP and by Dewi Lewis Publishing in 1997. Edinger received the Ernst Haas Award in 1990 for this work.

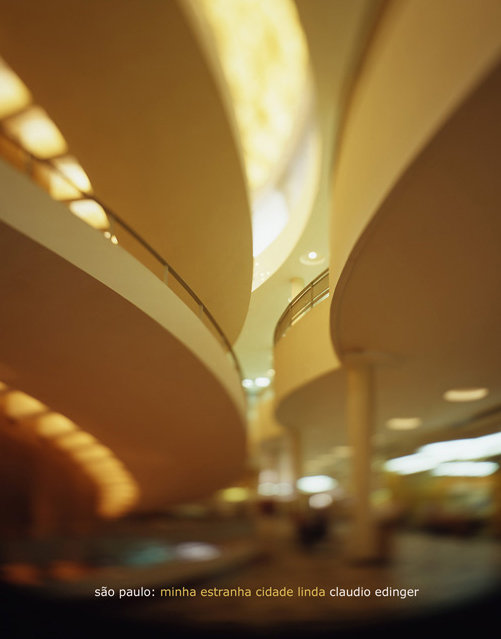
Book: São Paulo

From 1991 to 1996, Claudio photographed carnaval in Brazil's five different regions: Rio de Janeiro, Salvador, Recife/Olinda, São Paulo, and Paraty. When he returned to Brazil in 1996, Edinger published Carnaval, by DBA, DAP and Dewi Lewis (England). In 1999 Carnaval won the Higashikawa Prize in Japan.

Between 1994 and 1996, Claudio photographed the old part of Havana, Cuba. Old Havana was published in 1997 by Dewi Lewis, Edition Stemmle, DBA and DAP. That same year the book was named by American Photo as one of the best books of the year.

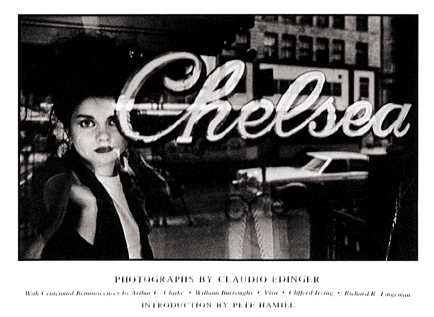
Book: Chelsea Hotel

In 1999, the book Vitória, city of the islands, about the capital of the Espirito Santo State in Brazil, was published by Abooks. In 2000 Edinger published Cityscapes, with photographs of New York. In 2001, Portraits, a collection of photos done for his books and for magazines. Both books were published by DBA.

In 2006 the book Flesh and Spirit, an anthology of 30 years of his work, was published by Umbrage and DBA.

Claudio began working with a large format, 4x5 camera, in 2000, to photograph the city where he was born, Rio de Janeiro. Rio was published in 2003 by DBA. It was named one of the best books of the year by Photo District News.

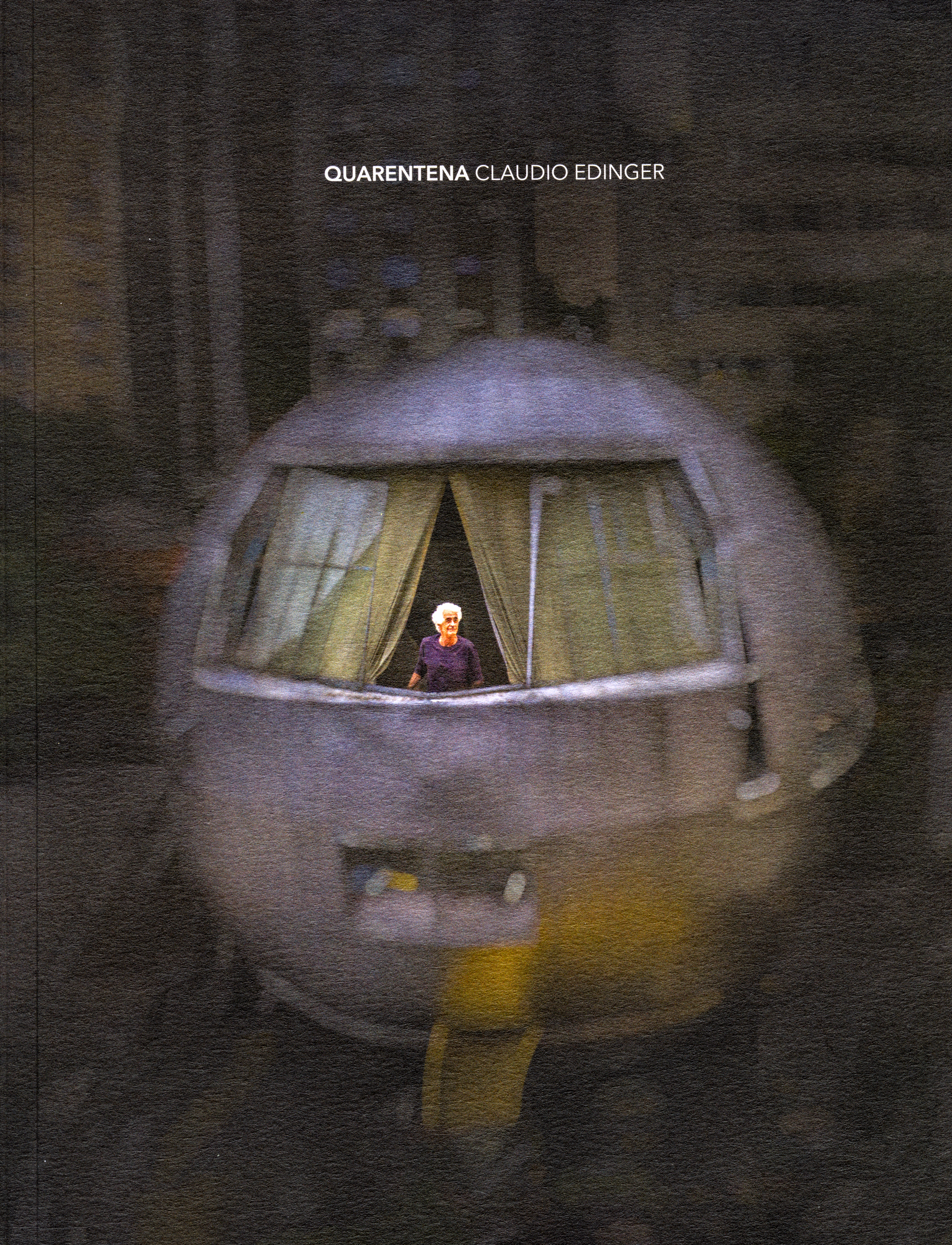
Book: Quarentena

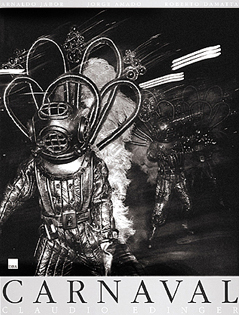
Book: Carnaval

== Photographic career ==
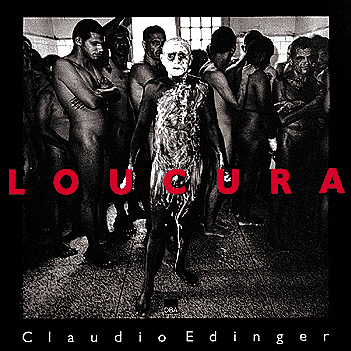
Book: Madness

Edinger's first series of photographs began in 1975 when he chose to explore the Martinelli Building in São Paulo, his home city. At one time the Martinelli was the tallest and most exclusive apartment building in São Paulo. When Edinger began his (photographic) essay on the Building, it had been reduced to a vertical slum. One can say that by exploring a subject in depth, Edinger had set the template of his aesthetic that the camera can be used to explore in depth which has resulted in over thirteen books dealing with specific subjects.

Upon his return to Brazil Edinger had to cope with the reality of trying to understand the consequences of Alzheimer's disease on a most personal nature. His beloved grandmother had been affected by the disease and he was moved to bring attention to the treatment of madness and dementia in Brazil and possibly in other places in the world where the mentally ill are often warehoused in asylums and become even more truly mad, This led to his series of photographs inside the Juqueri, Latin America's largest insane asylum. In order to seek out and understand the depth of what occurs there Edinger moved inside the asylum to live among the people housed there. The result of his search was the receipt of the Ernst Haas Award from the Maine Photographic Workshop. When he showed these harrowing photographs to Cornell Capa, he was met with the question, "Who would want to see this?" After seven years of showing the work around to various publishers it was finally accepted and published by DBA (Brazil) and Dewi Lewis (UK) and it is now a seminal work of photography depicting the mentally ill.

== Books ==
- Culturando a alfabetização - Retratos | Instituto FEFIG | 2026
- Machina Mundi Brasil | Editora Barléu | 2025
  Machina Mundi Brasil
  Chelsea Hotel (second edition) - Vento Leste Ed / Abbeville Press 2024
- Coisas Que Eu Vi - Vento Leste Ed. 2024
- Machina Mundi 3 - Vento Leste Ed. 2023
- Quarentena - Vento Leste Ed. 2022
- From Good Jesus to Miracles - Editions Bessard - 2021
- Machina Mundi - Sub Specie Aeterni - Vento Leste Ed. - 2020
- História da Fotografia Autoral e a Pintura Moderna - Ipsis Ed. - 2019
- Machina Mundi - Bazar do Tempo Ed. - 2017
- O Paradoxo do Olhar - Estudio Madalena 2014
- From Jesus to Miracles - BEI 2012
- Um Swami no Rio - (novel) Annablume 2009
- São Paulo - Minha Estranha Cidade Linda - DBA 2009
- Flesh and Spirit - Umbrage 2006
- Isso é que é - DBA 2006
- Rio - DBA 2003
- Cityscapes - DBA 2001
- Vitoria - Abooks 2000
- Portraits - DBA, ABooks 1999
- São Paulo Under Construction – ABooks 1998
- Madness - DBA, DAP, Dewi Lewis 1997
- Old Havana - DBA, DAP, Dewi Lewis, Editions Stemmle 1997
- Alt-Havana - Editions Stemmle (Zurique) 1997
- Carnaval - DBA, Dewi Lewis, DAP 1996
- The Making of Ironweed - Viking Penguin 1987
- Venice Beach - Abbeville Press 1985
- Chelsea Hotel - Abbeville Press 1983

== Awards ==
- Leica Medal of Excellence | 1983 | Chelsea Hotel
- Leica Medal of Excellence | 1985 | Venice Beach
- Life magazine Award | Finalist of W. Eugene Smith Grant | 1989 | Madness
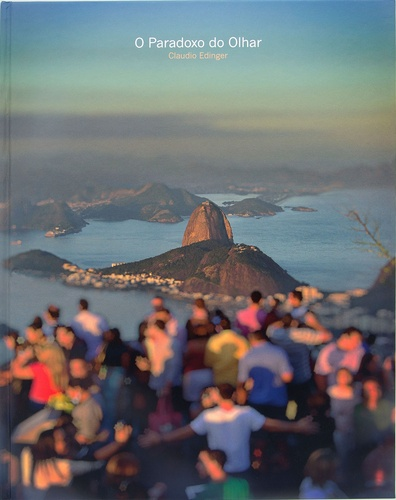
  Book: O Paradaxo do Olhar
- Ernst Haas Award |1990 | Madness
- One of the year's best books | American Photo | 1997 | Old Havana
- Vitae Foundation Scholarship | 1993 | Brazilian Carnaval
- Japan Foundation Scholarship | 1997 | Hong Kong
- Pictures of the Year | 1996 | Best Photo in a Magazine - Newsweek
- Higashikawa Award (Japan) | 1999 | Best Foreign Photographer | Carnaval
- PDN Photo Annual | 2003 | One of the year's best personal projects | Rio
- PDN Photo Annual | 2006 | One of the year's best books | Rio
- Porto Seguro Award | 2007 | São Paulo 4x5
- 2009 Best Photographic Book | 2009 | CLIX Magazine | São Paulo
- Porto Seguro Award | 2010 | Sertão da Bahia
- PDN Photo Annual | 2010 | One of the year's best personal projects | Sertão da Bahia
- Hasselblad Award | 2011 | Downtown Los Angeles
- Abril Award | 2012 | Best Photo Essay | Santa Catarina
- XII Prêmio Funarte Marc Ferrez de Fotografia | 2012 | A Serra de Santa Catarina - um Outro Brasil
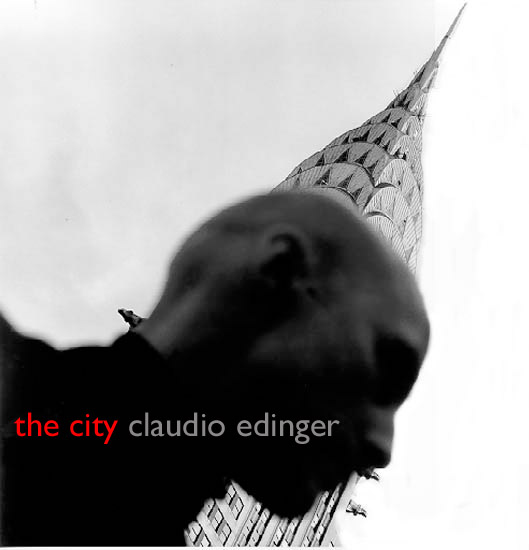
  Book: The City

== Exhibits ==
- 2026 Sp Arte Rotas | Galeria Lica Pedrosa | Machina Mundi Brasil | Panorâmica Rio | group
- Sp Arte | Dado castello branco | Machina Mundi Brasil | Solo
- 2025 Book launch Machina Mundi Brasil | Galeria Lica Pedrosa | solo
- 2025 Leica Gallery (New York) | Chelsea Hotel | solo
- 2024 MIS (São Paulo) | Coisas que eu vi | solo
- 2024 Oscar 900 (São Paulo) | Rio | group
- 2023 SP Arte (São Paulo) | Galeria Lume | Machina Mundi | group
- 2022 SP Arte Rotas Brasileiras (São Paulo) - Galeria Lume | Machina Mundi | solo
- 2022 Paraty em Foco (Rio de Janeiro) | Galeria Zoom | Paraty | solo
- 2022 Galeria Lume (São Paulo) | Quarentena | solo
- 2021 Paris Photo - Galeria Lume (Paris) | Sertão da Bahia | solo
- 2019 Galeria Murilo de Castro (Belo Horizonte) | Machina Mundi Nova York | group
- 2019 Galeria Carbono | Machina Mundi Toscana | solo
- 2019 Galeria Lume (São Paulo) | Machina Mundi New York | solo
- 2017 Musee de L'Homme (Paris) | Sertão da Bahia | group
- 2018 Galeria Arte 57 (São Paulo) | Machina Mundi New York | group
- 2017 Galeria Barbado (Lisboa) | Machina Mundi | solo
- 2016 Museu Olímpico de Lausanne (Switzerland) | Rio de Janeiro | group
- 2016 Le Magazyn (Los Angeles) | Venice Beach | solo
- 2016 Galeria Lume (São Paulo) | Machina Mundi | solo
- 2015 Galeria Pinakotheke | Rio de Janeiro | solo
- 2015 MUBE (São Paulo) | O Paradoxo do Olhar | solo
- 2015 SP Arte - Galeria Lume | Aeromodelismo | group
- 2015 SP Foto - Galeria Lume | Rio de Janeiro | group
- 2015 SP Foto - Galeria Arte 57 | Aeromodelismo | group
- 2015 ArtRio - Galeria Arte 57 | Aeromodelismo | group
- 2014 Galeria Garzon (Punta Del Leste) | O Paradoxo do Olhar | solo
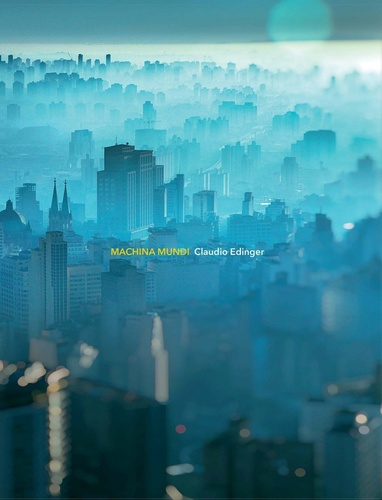
  Book: Machina Mundi
- 2014 Museu Oscar Niemeyer (Curitiba) | Sertão da Bahia | group
- 2014 SP Foto - Pequena Galeria | Sertão da Bahia | group
- 2014 SP Foto - Galeria Arte 57 | Rio de Janeiro | group
- 2014 ArtRio - Galeria Arte 57 | Rio de Janeiro | group
- 2014 La Quatrième Image (Paris) | Madness | solo
- 2013 La Quatrième Image (Paris) | Sertão da Bahia | solo
- 2013 ArtRIo - Galeria Arte 57 | Rio de Janeiro | group
- 2013 ArtRio - Pequena Galeria | Sertão da Bahia | group
- 2013 SP Arte - Galeria Arte 57 | Veneza | group
- 2013 SP Arte - Pequena Galeria | Sertão da Bahia | group
- 2013 SP Arte - Galeria Arte 57 | Veneza | group
- 2013 SP Arte - Galeria Lume | Sertão da Bahia | group
- 2013 SP Arte - Pequena Galeria | Sertão da Bahia | group
- 2013 SP Arte - Fotospot | New York | group
- 2013 Estudio Madalena CEI | São Paulo | solo
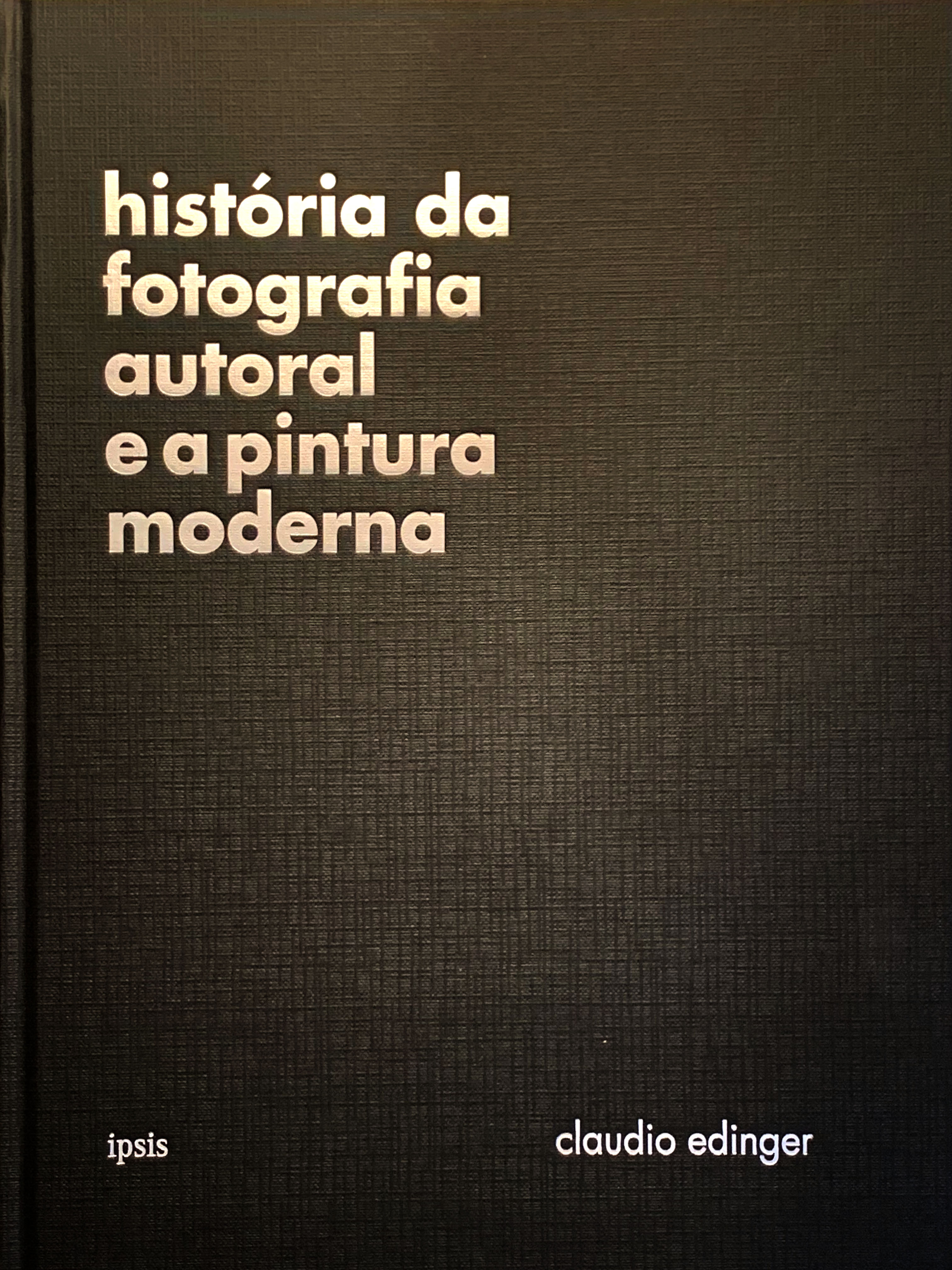
  Book: History of Fine Art Photography and Modern Painting
- 2013 Instituto Tomie Ohtake | São Paulo | group
- 2012 ArtRIo - Pequena Galeria (Rio de Janeiro) | Sertão da Bahia | group
- 2012 ArtRio - Galeria Arte 57 (Rio de Janeiro) | Rio de Janeiro BW | group
- 2012 SP Arte-Foto - Pequena Galeria (São Paulo) | Bahia | group
- 2012 SP Arte-Foto - Galeria Arte 57 (São Paulo) | Downtown LA | group
- 2012 Museu da Imagem e do Som (São Paulo) | Sertão da Bahia | solo
- 2012 Athena Galeria de Arte (Rio de Janeiro) | Rio e Sertão da Bahia | group
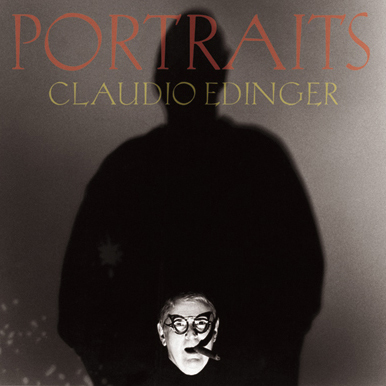
  Book: Portraits
- 2011 Samuel Owen Gallery (Connecticut) | São Paulo | group
- 2011 Maison Europeénne de la Photographie | Rio | group
- 2011 Athena Galeria de Arte (Rio de Janeiro) | Rio | group
- 2011 SIM (Curitiba) | Santa Catarina | group
- 2011 Casa 11 Photo (Rio de Janeiro) | Santa Catarina e São Paulo | group
- 2011 Galeria Maria Baró | Amazônia | group
- 2011 ArtRio - Galeria Athena (Rio de Janeiro) | Rio | group
- 2011 SP Arte Foto - Galeria Arte 57 (São Paulo) | Santa Catarina | group
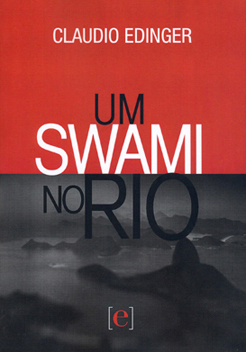
  Book: Um Swami no Rio
- 2011 SP Arte - Galeria Arte 57 (São Paulo) | Santa Catarina | group
- 2010 Arterix (São Paulo) | Sertão da Bahia | solo
- 2010 1500 Gallery (New York) | São Paulo | solo
- 2010 SP Arte Foto - Galeria arte 57 ( São Paulo) | Amazônia | group
- 2010 SP Arte - Galeria arte 57 ( São Paulo) | Amazônia | group
- 2009 Espaço de Arte Trio (São Paulo) | Paris | solo
- 2009 SP Arte Foto - Galeria arte 57 ( São Paulo) | Paris | group
- 2009 SP Arte - Galeria arte 57 ( São Paulo) | Paris | coletiva
- 2009 Galeria Arte 57 (São Paulo) | São Paulo | solo
- 2008 iContemporânea - Galeria Arte 57 (São Paulo) | São Paulo | solo
- 2008 SP Arte - Galeria Arte 57 ( São Paulo) | Madness | solo
- 2007 iContemporânea - Galeria Arte 57 (São Paulo) | Rio | solo
- 2007 Galeria Arte 57 ( São Paulo) | Flesh and Spirit | solo
- 2006 SP Arte - Galeria Arte 57 (São Paulo) | Sertão da Bahia | solo
- 2005 Palazzo Magnani (Milão) | Madness | solo
- 2003 Galeria Leica (São Paulo) | Rio | solo
- 2003 Photo España (Madrid) | Madness | solo
- 2001 Museu de Arte Moderna (São Paulo) | Cityscapes | solo
- 2000 Centro Cultural Banco do Brasil (Rio de Janeiro) | Portraits | solo
- 1999 Higashikawa Photo Fest (Japão) | Carnaval | solo
- 1999 Fotogaleria Li (São Paulo) | Portraits | solo
- 1997 Centro Cultural Banco do Brasil (Rio de Janeiro) | Carnaval | solo
- 1996 Museu Metropolitano de Curitiba | Carnaval| solo
- 1996 Museu da Imagem e do Som (São Paulo) | Carnaval | solo
- 1995 Galeria Fotóptica (São Paulo) | Old Havana | solo
- 1993 Maine Photographic Workshop (USA) | India | solo
- 1992 Galeria Cândido Mendes (Rio de Janeiro) | Madness | solo
- 1991 Visa Pour L’Image (Perpignam, France) | Madness | solo
- 1991 Museu de Arte de São Paulo | Pirelli Collection | solo
- 1990 Galeria Fotoptica (São Paulo) | Madness | solo
- 1990 Drew University (USA) | India, Madness, Hassidic Jews| solo
- 1988 Galeria Fotoptica (São Paulo) | India | solo
- 1985 Museu de Arte Contemporânea (São Paulo) | Trienal de Fotografia | solo
- 1984 Galeria Arco (São Paulo) | Venice Beach | solo
- 1983 Centre Georges Pompidou (Paris) | Brazilian Photography | solo
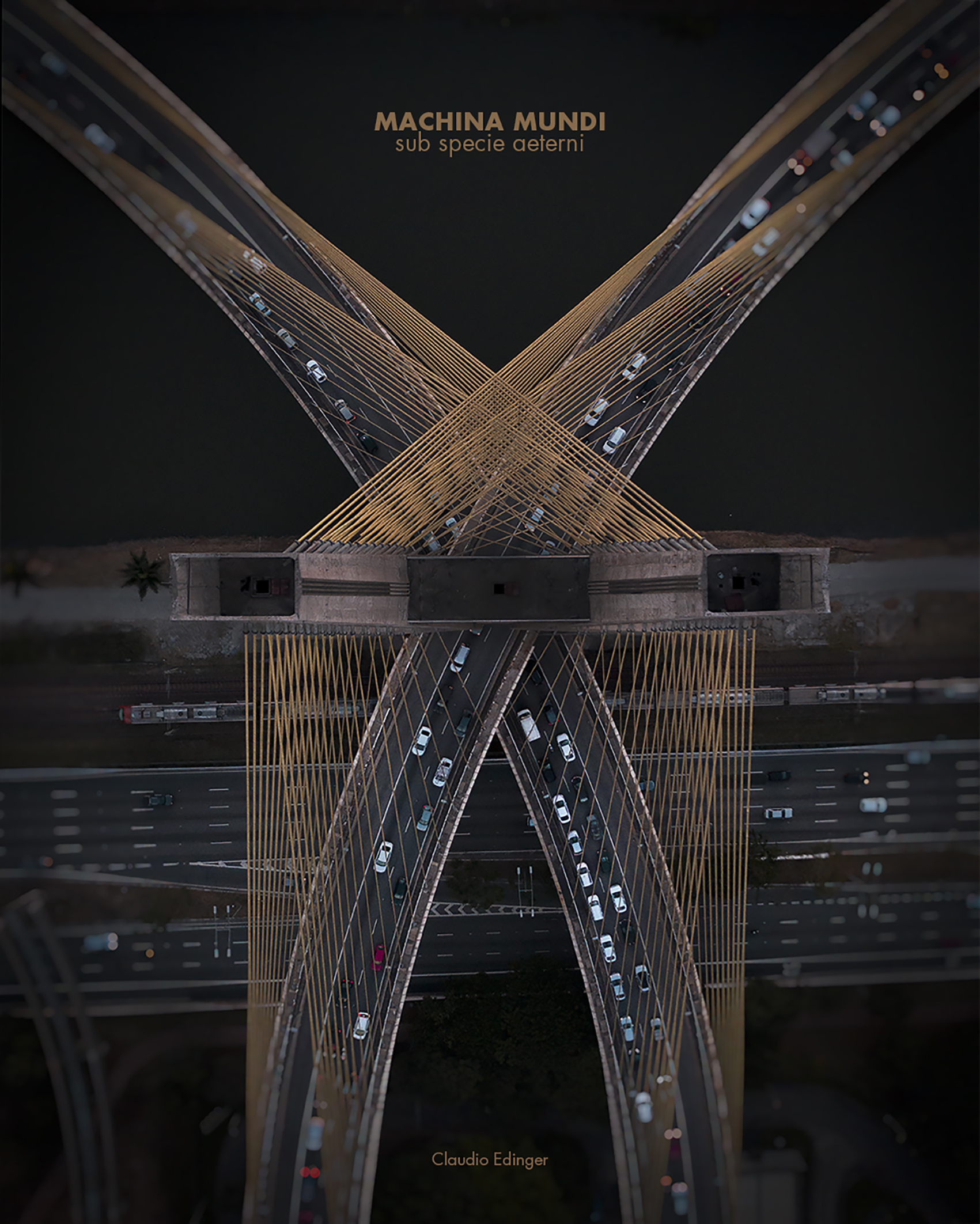
  Book: Machina Mundi - Sub Specie Aeterni
- 1983 Photographer’s Gallery (London) | Brazilian Photography | solo
- 1980 Parson's School of Design (New York) | Hassidic Jews | solo
- 1978 International Center of Photography (New York) | Hassidic Jews | solo
- 1976 Museu de Arte de São Paulo | São Paulo | group
- 1975 Museu de Arte de São Paulo | Martinelli | solo

== Teaching and lecturing ==
- The New School/Parson’s School of Design | teacher from 1979 to 1994.
- International Center of Photography | teacher from 1992 to 1995,
- The Maine Photographic Workshop | teacher from 1991 to 1993,
- New York University | 1985 | Lecture,
- School of Visual Arts | 1980/81/82 | Lecture,
- Drew University | 1990 | Lecture,
- Workshop | Jornal “O Globo”
- Workshop | Editora Abril
- Museu de Arte de São Paulo, Brazil | 1988 | Palestra
- Workshop | Paraty em Foco | 2006/07/08/09/10/11/12/13/14
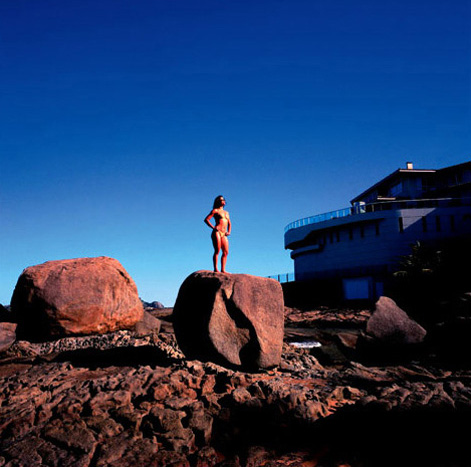
- Book: Vitória
  Workshop | Diversidade | Fortaleza | 2010
- Workshop | Foto Porto Alegre | 2009
- Workshop | Tiradentes Foto em Pauta | 2011/12/13/14
- Workshop e Palestra | Canela Foto Workshops | 2013
- Workshop | CASA DO SABER | 2013/14 | História da fotografia
- Workshop | CASA DO SABER | 2013/14 | Fotografia e Impressionismo

== Work in the collections of ==
- AT&T Photo Collection • Adriana Rondon • Alberto de Carvalho Alves • Alfredo Setubal • Aline de Almeida Prado
- Ana Luiza Brant de Carvalho e Nerval Ferreira Braga • Ana Vitória Mota • Anna Alvarenga • Antonia Galdeano
- Ataide Vaz • Antonio Carlos e Bibia Cunha Lima • Banco Itaú • Beatriz Vidigal Araújo • Bernardo e Celia Parnes
- Betina e Gilberto Martins Ferreira • Betty Cunali • Bianca Cutait • Bianca Rainer • Bianca Munis
- Bibia e Neno Cunha Lima • Brazil Golden Art Fund • Bruno Musatti • Carlos e Maria Emilia Carvalhosa
- Carla Ferraro • Carmen de Barros • Centro Cultural Banco do Brasil • Cliff Lee • Charlô Whately • Christina Cunali
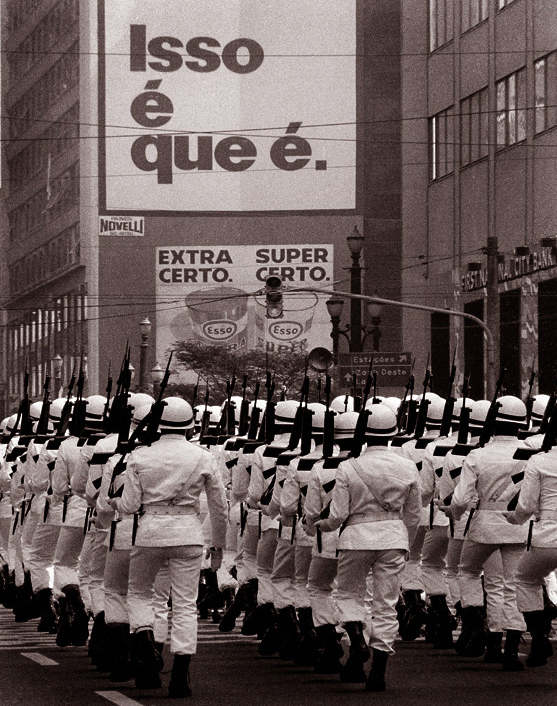
  Book: 30 anos
- Claudia Belinello • Claudia Jaguaribe • Credit Suisse • Dado Castello Branco • Daniel Feffer • David Feffer
- Claudia e João Nercessian • Denise Aguiar Alvarez
- Dudu e Mara Linhares • Eder Chiodetto • Edu e Helô Muylaert • Dr. Eduardo Villaça • Elias Landsberger
- Elisa Pacheco Fernandes • Equity International Photo Collection • Esther Giobbi • Fanny Feffer • Felipe Feitosa
- Flavia Soares • Flavio e Bia Bitelman • Fernando Ullmann • Greg e Claudia Sanchotene • Higashikawa Photofest (Japão)
- Gustavo Lacerda • Helô Monteiro da Silva • Helena e Toninho de Castro Sannini • Illia e Ana Maria Warchavchic
- International Center of Photography | New York • Itaú Cultura | São Paulo • Jay Colton • João e Fatima Farkas
- João Marcos Mendes de Souza • Joelma Radziuk • Joaquim Paiva • João Paulo e Adriana Cunha Lima
- João Paulo Diniz • Jorge e Janja Gonçalves • Jorginho da Cunha Lima • José Augusto de Santana • José Roberto Marinho
- José Olavo Scarabotolo • Juan Esteves • Jussara Magnami • Leonel Kaz • Ligia Danesi • Ligia Maura Costa
- Lisa Sander • Lourdinha Siqueira • Lucia Hauptmann • Luis Fernando e Maribel T. Neves • Luzia de Magalhães Padilha
- Maison Europeene de La Photographie (Paris) • MAC - Museu de Arte Contemporânea | São Paulo
- Malan Ferreira • MAM - Museu de Arte Moderna | São Paulo • Marcelo e Carol Filardi
- Maná Soares • Mariana Almeida Prado • Mariana e Ricardo Annunciato
- Marilisa Cardoso e José Eduardo de Lacerda Soares • Maria Emilia Cunali • Mark Whitley • Marli Mariano
- MASP - Museu de Arte de S. Paulo • Museu da Imagem e do Som | São Paulo • Museu Metronòm | Barcelona
- Museu Metropolitano de Curitiba • Marcel Jung • Nerval e Bize Ferreira Braga • Nina Sander • Oswaldo Pepe
- Otávio R. Macedo • Coleção Pirelli • Paula Palhares e Rubens Fernandes Junior • Patricia Mendes Caldeira
- Raquel Correa de Oliveira • Renato Ganhito • Renato Magalhães Gouvêa Jr. • Renato Padro Costa • Ricardo Moraes
- Ricardo Queiroz • Roberta Rossetto • Roberto Carvalho • Roberto Ruhman • Rodrigo Ribeiro
- Sandra Arruda e Andre Balbi • Sergio Gantmanis Munis • Silvio Bentes • Silvio Frota • Simonetta Persichetti
- Thomas Farkas • Tutu e Sérgio Galvão Bueno • Vanessa Gantmanis e Ivan Munis
- Visa Pour L' Image | Perpignam | França • Yael e Claudio Steiner

== Editorial credits ==
- American Photo • Art News • Business Week • Bons Fluidos • Boston Globe • Bravo
- Casa Claudia Luxo • Claudia • Conde Nast's Traveler • Daily Telegraph of London • Details • Elle • Epoca
- Estado de São Paulo • Folha de S.Paulo • Forbes • Fortune • Fotosite • Fotografe Melhor
- Digital Photographer • Isto é • Joyce Pascowitch • Life • Los Angeles Times • Marie Claire • Money
- National Geographic • Newsweek • The New York Times Magazine • Nico • Oi • Poder • Photo France
- Photo Italy • Photo District News • Paris Match • People • Playboy • República • Rolling Stone • Self
- The Smithsonian • Sports Illustrated • Stern • Time • Town & Country • Travel & Leisure • USA Today
- US • US News • Valor • Vanity Fair • Veja • Washington Post

== Bibliography ==
- Edinger, Claudio (2009). Paris, apesar de tudo. Poder Joyce Pascowitch (11) 52-59.
- Mello, C. Hélio (2009). Foco na sensibilidade. Brasileiras (20) 28-29.
- Gonçalves, N. Daniel (2009). Mistérios da cidade. Veja São Paulo (42-10) 15.
- Pan (2007). MNP (34) 74-83.
- Girls of Ipanema. (2007). Nico (summer 2007) 162-171.
- O olhar do pesquisador (2007). Fhox (114) 78-79.
- Revelou-se a sua enorme curtição. (2007). Próxima Viagem (89) 44-45.
- Jeito carioca (2007). Gol (60) 64-67.
- Edinger, Claudio (2006). De jesus a milagres. Revista Fotosite (10) 29-34.
- Elias, Érico (2006). História de um ensaísta versátil. Fotografe Melhor (113) 38-45.
- Rocha, Flávia (2006) Por um sertão imortal. Casa Vogue (250) 184-187.
- Les grands maîtres du Brésil. (2005). Photo (420) 86.
- Edinger, Claudio (2005) Fotografia na chapa. Revista Fotosite (5) 50-55.
- A-List Special Interests. (2003). Travel+Leisure (9) 152.
