= Mikiko Hara =

Japanese photographer (born 1967)

- 原 美樹子
- Born: 1967 (age 58–59); Toyama, Japan
- Education: Keio University, Tokyo College of Photography
- Known for: Photography

Mikiko Hara (原 美樹子, Hara Mikiko; born 1967) is a Japanese photographer.

== Biography ==
Hara was born in Toyama in 1967. She graduated from Keio University in 1990 with a degree in literature, and then studied at the Tokyo College of Photography until 1996.

== Photography ==
Using a medium-format camera, Hara takes photographs of people she encounters outside, in the train, and so forth. She said "My shooting style is so-called snapshot, so I can say all of my photographs were taken by a mere accident." They are the photographs of somewhere yet nowhere."

Comparing her photography with that of Rinko Kawauchi, Ferdinand Brueggeman writes

Mikiko Hara's photography is poetic as well, but she has a different topic. She talks about distance and isolation of people in public spaces – especially of women.

== Exhibitions ==
=== Solo exhibitions ===
- Is as It. Gallery le Deco (Shibuya, Tokyo), 1996.
- Agnus Dei. Ginza Nikon Salon (Ginza, Tokyo), 1998.
- Utsuro no seihō (うつろの製法). Shinjuku Konica Plaza (Shinjuku, Tokyo), 2001. The Third Gallery Aya (Osaka), 2001.
- Hatsugo no shūen (発語の周縁). Guardian Garden (Ginza, Tokyo), July 2004.
- Hysteric Thirteen publication exhibition. Place M (Shinjuku, Tokyo), August–September 2005.
- Humoresque. Appel (Kyōdō, Tokyo), 2006.
- Blind Letter. Cohen Amador Gallery (New York), 2007.
- Kumoma no atosaki (雲間のあとさき). Gallery Tosei (Nakano, Tokyo), May 2008.
- Blind Letter. Third District Gallery (Shinjuku, Tokyo), June 2010.
- In the Blink of an Eye 1996-2009. Miyako Yoshinaga Gallery (New York), September-November 2017
- Kyrie Miyako Yoshinaga Gallery, September - October 2019
- The Wind Cannot be Named, Ibashoo (Antwerp, Belgium), September 2020

=== Other exhibitions ===
- Puraibētorūmu 2: Shin sekai no shashin hyōgen (プライベートルーム2 新世代の写真表現) = Private Room II: Photographs by a New Generation of Women in Japan. Contemporary Art Center, Art Tower Mito (Mito, Ibaraki), April–June 1999.
- Japan: Keramik und Fotografie: Tradition und Gegenwart. Deichtorhallen (Hamburg), January–May 2003.
- Pingyao International Photography Festival (Pingyao, China), 2004.
- Nichijō kara no tabi (日常からの旅). Shinjuku Epsite (Shinjuku, Tokyo), November–December 2005. (in Japanese)
- Absolutely Private: Contemporary Photography, vol 4 = 私のいる場所 新進作家展vol.4 ゼロ年代の写真論. Tokyo Metropolitan Museum of Photography (Ebisu, Tokyo), March–April 2006.
- A Private History. Fotografisk Center (Copenhagen), September 2007 – January 2008.
- Sangyō toshi Kawasaki no ayumi 100-nen (産業都市・カワサキのあゆみ100年). Kawasaki City Museum (Kawasaki), 2007.
- Shashin no genzai, kako, mirai: Shōwa kara kyō made (写真の現在・過去・未来 昭和から今日まで). Yokohama Civic Art Gallery (Yokohama), December 2009.
- Shibui: Six Japanese Photographers 1920s–2000. Stephen Cohen Gallery (Los Angeles), April–June 2009.
- In Focus: Tokyo. J. Paul Getty Museum (Los Angeles, California), August–December 2014.

== Collections ==
- The Art Institute of Chicago, Chicago, IL
- Bibliothèque nationale de France (Paris)
- Getty Museum

== Books ==
- Hysteric Thirteen. Tokyo: Hysteric Glamour, 2005.
- These Are Days. Tokyo: Osiris, 2014. ISBN 978-4-905254-04-1. (Note: The publisher's page about These Are Days is here.)
- Change. New York: Gould Collection, 2016. ISBN 978-0-9973596-0-2. With a short story by Stephen Dixon, "Change." Edition of 500 copies plus 26 copies with a print. (Note: The publisher's page about Change is here.)
