= Manit Sriwanichpoom =

Thai photographer

Manit Sriwanichpoom (Thai: มานิต ศรีวานิชภูมิ, born 27 September, 1961) is a Thai photographer, writer, contemporary artist and social activist. His most notable work is a photo set called Pink Man. The set consists of photos of a man in pink silk tuxedo and his pink shopping cart shot in different locations around the world.

== Biography ==
Manit was born in Bangkok and graduated from Srinakharinwirot University. After graduation, he worked as a photographer for Bureau Bangkok. In 2007, he won the Higashikawa Prize from a photo fiesta in Hokkaido, Japan.

He worked in the film industry as a producer and cinematographer of Citizen Juling (2008), Shakespeare Must Die (2012) and Censor Must Die (2014).

== Work ==
In 1982, Manit had his first exhibition in a group exhibition called "5 View Points" at the Bhirasri Modern Art Institute in Bangkok. His first solo exhibition was "Artists in Back & White" in 1990 at Alliance Française in Bangkok. In 1985, he had his first international group exhibition "The 4th Asian Painting" in Brunei. He got his first solo international exhibition "Phantom Parody" in Singapore and "Bangkok in Pink" in Japan in 2002.

=== Pink Man ===
In 1997, he created the Pink Man collection to convey his attitude towards consumerism in Thailand and around the world. The first collection was called Pink Man Begins, featuring photos of a man in a pink silk tuxedo (played by Sompong Thawee) and his pink shopping cart in La-Lai-Sup market, Bangkok.

According to Manit, "Pink Man is my upset and alienated feeling towards the concept of consumerism which has been accepted simply and without consideration by Thai society. I feel that this system has enslaved us without our realization. Moreover, we are being forced to act in the same way; there is a move towards uniformity. Pink Man is wandering quietly and smilelessly, like a robot".

In 1998, he made a second set of photographs called Pink Man on Tour are taken at tourist locations in Thailand to show disagreement to the government's campaign called "Amazing Thailand". In 2000, he published the Pink Man on European Tour" photo set; In 2001, he made a photo set called Horror in Pink showing photos of the pink man edited into historical photos of the 1976 Thammasat University massacre to remind people of that event again. In 2003, he created the sets call Pink Man in Venice, Hungry Ghost, and Pink Man in Paradise. He published La Vie en Pink in 2004, Pink, White & Blue in 2005, Beijing pink in 2006 and made a model product from the Pink Man character as "Pink Man—The Icon of Consumerism" during 2007 – 2008.

=== Kathmandu Gallery ===
In 2006, he also opened a gallery called Kathmandu Photo Gallery on Pan Road, Silom, Bangkok. It features his own works, but also the works of other artists.

=== Cinema Oasis ===
With collaborator and financial backer, Ing Kanjanavanit, AKA Ing K, Manit opened Cinema Oasis in central Bangkok. It has a 48-seat screening room with a five-metre screen and Dolby 5.1 surround sound system. Manit says that the initial urge to build the cinema was fueled the pair's outrage over the banning of their films. The cinema's mission has evolved into exposing people to films they would not normally see and to provide a platform for independent filmmakers. "Our first programme was a series called 'Beyond Pad Thai', Thai films that are underrated and little known," he said.

=== Political work ===
In October 2007, Manit and Vasan Sitthiket together founded a political party called the "Silapin Party", to criticize the policy of the Thai Rak Thai Party. Manit served as deputy chief, but later he quit the party on 15 November 2007. The party was disbanded in 2009.
