= Jason Teraoka =

To Hell and Back, acrylic on canvas painting by Jason Teraoka, 2010

Jason Jun Teraoka (born 1964) is a figurative painter who was born in Kapaʻa, Hawaiʻi. He is a fourth-generation Japanese-American who lives and works in Honolulu, and is largely self-taught. In 2000, he received the Hawaii State Foundation on Culture and the Arts Arts Acquisition Award, and in 2001 he received the Reuben Tam Award for Painting from the Honolulu Museum of Art.

The artist is known for his toy-like sculptures and narrative portraits. Teraoka's Neighbors series comprises 6-by-8-inch portraits, painted in acrylic and glue on paper; the entire 88-painting series was acquired by Tokyo's Hara Museum of Contemporary Art for its permanent collection.

Jason Teraoka has exhibited at The Contemporary Museum, Honolulu (now the Honolulu Museum of Art Spalding House), Hawaii Pacific University (Kaneʻohe, Hawaiʻi), the Hara Museum of Contemporary Art (Tokyo), the Honolulu Museum of Art, the Massachusetts College of Art and Design (Boston), University of Hawaiʻi (Honolulu), and the University of Minnesota (Minneapolis). The Hara Museum of Contemporary Art (Tokyo, Japan), the Hawaii State Art Museum, and the Honolulu Museum of Art are among the public collections holding his paintings.
