= Shakespeare Must Die =

2012 Thai film adaptation of Macbeth

- Directed by: Ing Kanjanavanit
- Produced by: Manit Sriwanichpoom
- Release date: 2012
- Running time: 176 minutes
- Country: Thailand
- Language: Thai

Shakespeare Must Die (Thai: เชคสเปียร์ต้องตาย) is a 2012 Thai adaptation of William Shakespeare's Macbeth. It was directed by Ing Kanjanavanit and produced by Manit Sriwanichpoom. The Yingluck Shinawatra government banned the film as a national security threat due to the film's visual references to the paramilitary's violent crackdown on student protesters in the Thammasat University massacre of 6 October 1976.

The Thai-language film tells the story of a theatre group in a fictional country resembling Thailand that is staging a production of Macbeth, in which an ambitious general murders his way to the Scottish throne.

One of the film's main characters is a dictator named "Dear Leader", who bears a resemblance to former Thai Prime Minister Thaksin Shinawatra, who was ousted in a 2006 coup.

== Controversy ==
Censors at the culture ministry issued a brief statement saying that the film could not be distributed in Thailand because it "has content that causes divisiveness among the people of the nation", without specifying which scenes were offensive. Ing Kanjanavanit, the film's director, said the censorship committee objected to anti-monarchical overtones in the film as well as politically charged content, including a scene based on a photograph from Bangkok's 1976 student uprising showing a demonstrator being lynched. Ing said she will appeal to overturn the ban.

"The committee questioned why we wanted to bring back violent pain from the past to make people angry," Ing said in an interview. The censors also disliked the attire of a murderer in the film, who wore a bright red hooded cloak—the same colour worn by the pro-Thaksin demonstrators known as the Red Shirts.

The director called the ruling absurd and a reflection of the fear in Thai society. "I feel like we are heading to a very dark, dark place right now, a place full of fears and everyone has to be extra careful about what they say," she said, adding that the character resembling Thaksin could represent any leader accused of corruption and abuse of power. "When Cambodians watch this they'll think it's Hun Sen. When Libyans watch it they would think it's Gaddafi."

Sharp partisan political battles in the wake of the 2006 coup have unleashed fierce questioning of established institutions in Thailand. In 2011, the film board banned a movie about a transgender father struggling to raise two children, called Insects in the Backyard, saying it contained scenes that were immoral and pornographic.

== Documentary film about the controversy ==
A documentary film about the censorship and controversy surrounding the film called Censor Must Die was screened for the first time on 1 June 2013, at the Bangkok Art and Culture Centre (BACC). Manit Sriwanichpoom made a short speech prior to the screening which was attended by an audience of several hundred.
