= Rika Noguchi =

Japanese photographer (born 1971)

Rika Noguchi (野口里佳 Noguchi Rika, born 1971) is a Japanese photographic artist.

== Biography ==
Noguchi was born in Tokyo and has a degree in photography from the Department of Photography, College of Art at Nihon University in 1994. She has lived and worked as a photographer in Berlin, Germany between 2004 and 2016 and is currently based in Okinawa, Japan.

Noguchi focuses on photography of nature, with landscape sceneries and animals. Her frequent use of close-ups and blurred images create an aura of impressionism. Noguchi's work often deals with the limits of human ability and ambition. Her series "New Land" (1999-2000) documented the construction of artificial islands off the coast of the Netherlands. Her series "Rocket Hill" (begun in 2001) recorded the facilities and launch pad of Japan's Tanegashima Space Center. Her "Sun" series (begun in 2005) shot the sun using a pinhole camera, emphasizing a very Earth-bound perception of the solar body.

Early works include “A Prime” (1997), a series of landscape shots with lonely persons forming undefined foregrounds. She later made “Color of the Planet” (2004) and “In the Desert” (2007) depicting urban and natural landscapes, with colourful blurs and light reflections, inspiring a sense of distance to the subject. Recent works include “The Sun” (2005-2008), a series with the sun as a source of light through a pinhole camera. “I Dreamt of Flying 2” (2009) depicts warped images of the starry sky, the way we would perceive the stars looking out from a spacecraft travelling at the light of speed.

== Exhibits ==
The Hara Museum of Contemporary Art in Tokyo held a solo show in 2004 of around 40 of Noguchi's works in, "I Dreamt of Flying."

In 2009, Noguchi's work was included in "The Light" at the National Art Center, Tokyo along with Yoko Matsumoto.

A solo exhibition featuring Noguchi's “Light Reaching the Future” was arranged at the Izu Photo Museum in 2011. The artist juxtaposed photographic works with silkscreen works.

A solo exhibition of her work took place in 2017 with the title "At the Bottom of the Sea" at Taka Ishii Gallery, Tokyo.

From October 2022 through January 2023, Noguchi had a solo exhibit at the Tokyo Photographic Art Museum.

== See also ==
Rika Noguchi | CI08 Life on Mars - Interview with Rika Noguchi on YouTube (6m24s)

Rika Noguchi - personal website
