= Osamu James Nakagawa =

Japanese-American photographer

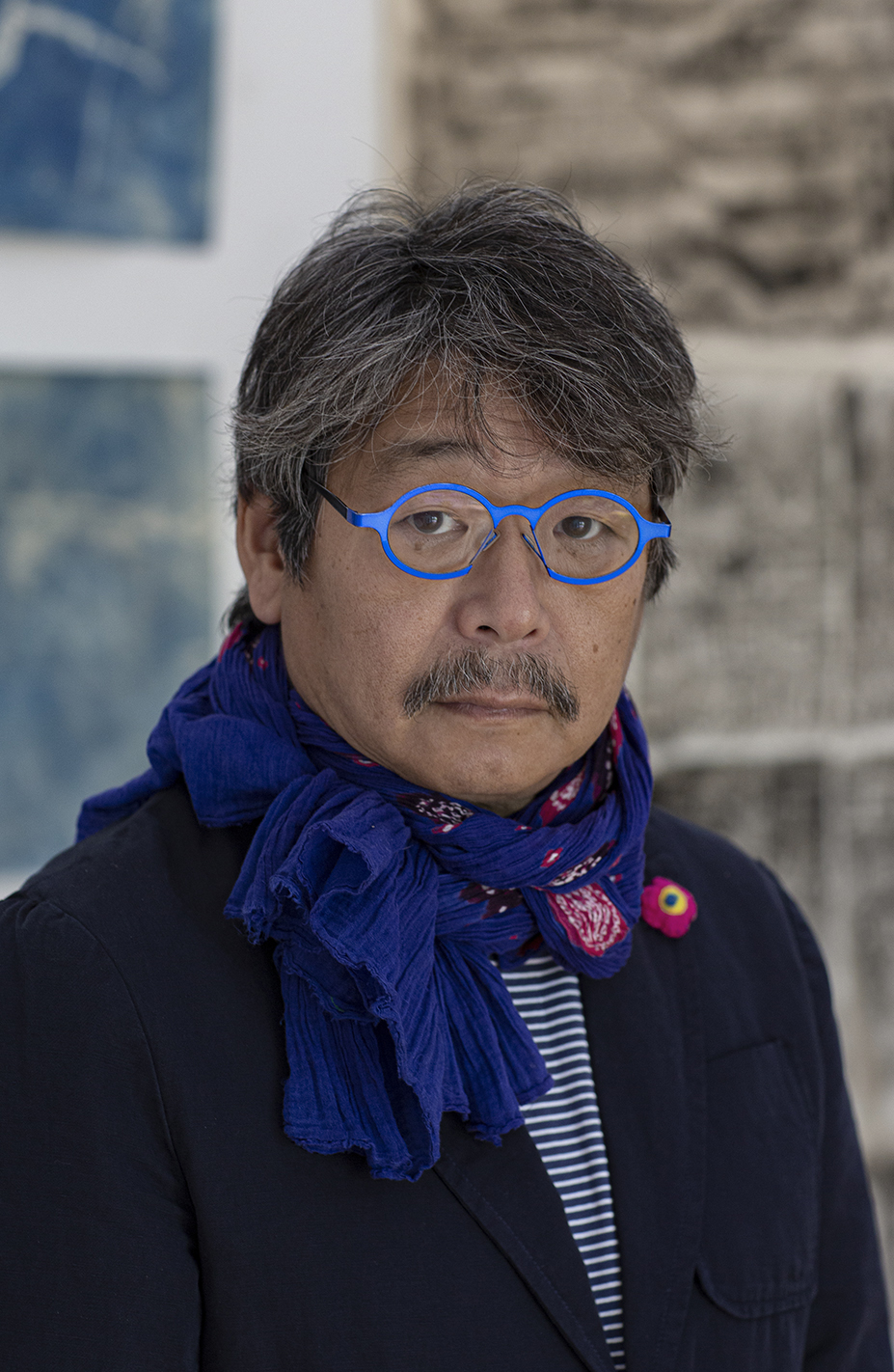
- Nakagawa at DePaul University in Chicago, Illinois, 2015
- Born: 1962 (age 63–64); New York City, New York, United States
- Education: University of Houston, University of St. Thomas
- Occupation: Photographer
- Awards: Guggenheim Fellowship, Higashikawa Prize, American Photography Institute, Japan Foundation
- Website: Osamu James Nakagawa

Osamu James Nakagawa (born 1962) is a Japanese-American photographer. He is known for multiple, cross-cultural series exploring geopolitical landscape, family, memory and personal identity, including his own transnational experience. He initially gained notice as an early digital photographer, however his work has ranged between digital color and black-and-white imagery, and computer-manipulated collage, traditional "straight" photography and large photographic installation. Writers such as curator Anne Wilkes Tucker describe his work as challenging, layered and in a poetic vein, rather than documentary or narrative in nature.

Nakagawa has received a Guggenheim Fellowship and awards from the cities of Higashikawa and Sagamihara in Japan, among others. He has exhibited internationally at venues including the Metropolitan Museum of Art, Tokyo Photographic Art Museum, Museum of Fine Arts, Houston, and Sakima Art Museum in Japan. His work belongs to the public collections of those museums and others, including the Museum of Contemporary Photography and George Eastman Museum. Nakagawa is a professor of photography at Indiana University and lives and works in Bloomington, Indiana.

== Early life and education ==
Nakagawa was born in 1962 in New York City to Japanese-born parents. He was raised in Tokyo until age 15, when his father's work took the family to Houston, Texas. After he completed high school, his parents returned to Japan, but Nakagawa remained in Houston, earning a BA in studio art from St. Thomas University in 1986. He worked in Tokyo for two years as a commercial and editorial photography assistant, before returning to the U.S. to study photography at the University of Houston (MFA, 1993). In 1998, he moved to Indiana with wife and daughter, joining the School of Art, Architecture + Design at Indiana University, where he is the Ruth N. Halls distinguished professor of photography and director of the Center for Integrative Photographic Studies.

== Exhibitions ==
Nakagawa received early attention for his work in digital photography (then in its pre-Photoshop infancy) through the exhibitions and publications "Metamorphoses: Photography in the Electronic Age" (1994–9, Fashion Institute of Technology; Philadelphia Museum of Art), "Picturing Asia" (1994–5, Houston Center for Photography), and "Field of Vision" (1998, Contemporary Arts Museum Houston). A 1994 Time review of the "Metamorphoses" show—one of the first devoted to digital photography—suggested that work such as Nakagawa's challenged and subverted long-held myths about the truth of photography.

Nakagawa's later exhibitions were held at sepiaEYE in New York (2000–18), PGI in Tokyo (2014, 2018) and Kyoto University of the Arts (2014), among others. He was also included in the shows "After Photoshop: Manipulated Photography in the Digital Age" (Metropolitan Museum of Art, 2012), "War/Photography: Photographs of Armed Conflict and its Aftermath," (Museum of Fine Arts Houston; Brooklyn Museum, 2012–4), and “From the Cave” (Tokyo Photographic Art Museum, 2018).

== Work and reception ==
Critics have identified two key strains in Nakagawa's practice that sometimes intersect, one personal and introspective and the other socio-political and historical in focus. The former strain includes his family-related "Kai" and "Ma" works and early "Mado" series; the latter strain includes the U.S.-focused "Drive-In Theater" and "Eclipse" works and his multiple series examining the history of Okinawa, his wife's native region, which he considers an inherited "third culture."

=== Early series ===
Osamu James Nakagawa, K.K.K., from the "Drive-in Theater" series, Type-C print, 26.5" x 40", 1992.

Nakagawa's "Mado" (window) series (1988–2000) consisted of 4-by-5-inch black-and-white minimalist prints of off-kilter perspectives through screens and delicate, abstract patterns formed by raindrops and condensation. The New York Times described them as wistful views "of a perpetual outsider" inviting close attention to their "calligraphic simplicity." His "Drive-In Theater" and "Billboard" series (1992–7) employed an entirely different mode, dissecting the American dream by digitally compositing jarring images (protests, parades, border crossings, KKK demonstrations) of social and racial injustices on to the derelict screens of once-iconic drive-in theaters and billboards he photographed. Critics have described them as façades or projections expressing Nakagawa's mixed feelings about the U.S. while also spotlighting concealed or obfuscated historical issues and fabricated national mythologies (e.g., American Indian Flag, 1992; Windshield Washer, 1996).

In the wake of the 2016 American election, Nakagawa revisited those works in a new series, "Eclipse" (2018– ), which consisted of dark gray-toned prints of abandoned screens (from old negatives and newly photographed scenes) that he left empty as blank, dystopian monuments in disorienting Midwest landscapes. Writers suggest that the images—which employ a unique printing process offering exceptional sharpness and tonality—seem to merge night and day, positive and negative, present and future in contrast to the polarized, black-and-white political climate in which they were produced.

=== "Kai" and "Ma" series ===
Nakagawa's "Kai, Following the Cycle of Life" and "Ma, Between the Past" series focus on themes of family, memory, intergenerational connection and change, and loss. The "Kai" (Japanese for cycle) works embody the Buddhist idea of each moment's existence occurring within an everchanging cycle of birth, life, death and rebirth. He began them during a period of swift change in his life, when he simultaneously confronted his father's terminal cancer and the impending birth of his daughter. Seeking to freeze individual moments and memories—the most basic function of photography—he produced the "Kai I" images (1998–2005) using a traditional black-and-white, silver gelatin process. Writers characterized the square-format series by its subtle tonal values, poetic quality and oblique, symbolic vision; ARTnews critic Robert C. Morgan described Nakagawa's approach to the difficult subject "startling, convincing, and ultimately, redeeming." The series includes a scene of Nakagawa's daughter surrounded by stuffed toys with the shadows of her parents bowing toward her (Morning Light, Bloomington, 1999) and images of chest X-rays, ultrasounds, and his father before and after receiving chemotherapy (Hot Springs, Hakone, Japan, Summer 1998). Kai, Ninomiya (1998) represents three generations, depicting Tomoko standing on a beach holding their daughter with a funeral portrait of Nakagawa's father balanced against her hip.

Osamu James Nakagawa, Okinawa #017, from the "Banta" series, archival pigment print, 20" x 60", 2006–8.

In 2010, as his mother's health began to decline, Nakagawa started the "Kai II" series, which he photographed in digital color, allowing him to develop a subdued, pastel palette with a more feminine quality. The series depicts his wife and daughter, but primarily, his mother, with images of her passage through medical care, her belongings (perfume, nylons, empty walker washed by the Ninomiya surf), and finally, her hand in Nakagawa's just prior to death.

For the "Ma" series (2003), Nakagawa juxtaposed or digitally combined inherited family photos, home-movie stills and his own unused snapshots in triptychs and collages. The series' title (which means between) and formats reflect an attempt to make sense of his own life experience and three generations of images taking place in an evolving, liminal space between two countries. It mixes traditional Japanese and American popular cultures, images of unknown ancestors and Nakagawa's youth, and themes of movement, displacement, memory and time, using repeated motifs (e.g., a mountain in Passing View) and pointed juxtapositions, as in Castle (2003–5), which interlaces pink-and-blue-toned filmstrips from a childhood vacation to Disneyland into a 1912 sepia-toned, formal group photo celebrating the construction of a large Osaka house.

=== Okinawa series ===
After "Ma", Nakagawa moved away from collage with three series—"Remains," "Banta" and "Gama"—that explored the enduring legacy of the Japanese occupation of Okinawa near the end of World War II. The latter two series focus on landscape as an entry point and witness to history and suffering.

The "Banta" (Okinawan for cliff) works (2008) depict towering natural structures that became known as "Suicide Cliffs" after thousands of locals dove to their deaths during the Battle of Okinawa in 1945. Critics describe the images as experiential and physical in their effect (rather than historical or archeological), evoking a palpable sense of absence, silence, beauty and weight concerning a tragic history that has often been glossed over. Nakagawa photographed consecutive parts of each subject with a high-resolution camera, then digitally stitched them to create large (20” x 60”), seamless vertical images, whose format references traditional kakemono landscape scroll paintings. The photographs have been noted for a hyperreal quality that combines razor-sharp focus and detail (of visceral crags, craters and planes) impossible to capture in a single frame and a dizzying quality resulting from tilted perspectives and tight cropping.

Osamu James Nakagawa, Tennessee #1, from the "Eclipse" series, archival carbon-pigment print, 32" x 40", 2018.

In the "Gama" (Okinawan for cave) series (2009–11), Nakagawa focused on Okinawan caves that were once places of worship and burial, which served as bunkers, bases, hospitals and sites of tragedy during the war. He shot the pitch-black caves by flashlight in long, single exposures, then digitally adjusted the distorted color by memory. The photographs appear like massive textured abstractions, which on close inspection suggest figuration or reveal details and artifacts—pieces of bowls and bottles, bone fragments, vines—from various uses. Writers have suggested they tap into primal fears of being trapped or groping in the dark, describing the effect as contemplative and haunting, beautiful, "horrific and awesome." Nakagawa's "Yami" and "Gama: Darkness" series (2013– ) were influenced by Richard Serra's drawings and push sensory experience of the caves further, containing viewers in darkness, sometimes obscured by direct painting with sumi ink and rust onto the print surfaces.

Nakagawa has also produced a series of cyanotype-printed photograms, "Fences" (2015–8), that address the dispute over the relocation of the U.S. airbase in Okinawa through varied textural surfaces of fence patterns, leaf and vine silhouettes, and barbed wire punctures produced from outside the base.

== Awards ==
Nakagawa has been awarded fellowships from the John S. Guggenheim Foundation (2009), American Photography Institute (2000) and Houston Center For Photography (1993), and grants from the Japan Foundation (2008) and Indiana Arts Commission (2001), among others. He has also received the Society for Photographic Education Insight Award (2015), Higashikawa Prize (2010), Sagamihara Award (2014), Santa Fe Center for Visual Arts competition prize (2001), and residencies from Light Work and Anderson Ranch Art Center (both 2002).

== Collections ==
His work belongs to the public collections of the Metropolitan Museum of Art, Museum of Fine Arts Houston, Museum of Contemporary Photography, Tokyo Photographic Art Museum, Higashikawa Cultural Center, Kiyosato Museum of Photographic Arts and Sakima Art Museum in Japan, Chrysler Museum of Art, Corcoran Museum of Art, George Eastman House, Light Work, Nelson Atkins Museum of Art, and Worcester Art Museum.
