= Yasuko Kotani =

Japanese photographer

Yasuko Kotani (小谷 泰子, Kotani Yasuko; born August 27, 1962) is a Japanese photographer.

== Early life ==
Kotani was born in Nishinomiya, Japan. She graduated from Kumamoto University in 1985 and began creating photographs.

== Photographic career ==
Kotani first had work appear in an exhibit in 1991. She won her first award in 1992, during an exhibit held by the Photographic Society of Japan.

During her career she has won several awards and held several solo exhibitions. Her works are held by the Tokyo Metropolitan Museum of Photography.

Kotani's photographs are typically of nude people floating in a dark blue background, evoking a sense of being deep underwater.

== Bibliography ==
- Kotani, Yasuko (2019). 青い闇. Akaaka.
