= Yuki Onodera =

Japanese photographer

- Born: 1962 (age 63–64); Tokyo, Japan
- Known for: Photography
- Awards: Kimura Ihei Award

Yuki Onodera (オノデラ ユキ, Onodera Yuki; born 1962) is a Japanese photographer. She graduated from the Kuwazawa Design School in Tokyo. She lives in Paris, France.

== Biography ==
Onodera works with large images (some reaching 8 meters) and wants her work to be "tangible". In her series "Portrait of Second-Hand Clothes" Onodera used the clothes from "Christian Boltanski's installation 'Dispersion,' a large pile of used garments meant to evoke death and loss." She has worked in Paris since 1993, and she has had solo exhibits around the world. Institutions that hold her work include: The Getty Museum, the San Francisco Museum of Modern Art, and The Tokyo Metropolitan Museum of Photography.

== Awards ==
- 2001, New Photographer Higashikawa Prize
- 2002, Kimura Ihei Award
- 2006, Prix Niépce

== Publications ==
- How to Make a Pearl, Nazraeli Press, 2002
- Transvest, Nazraeli Press, 2004, ISBN 978-1-59005-086-6
