= Tomoko Kashiki =

Japanese artist (born 1982)

- Born: Tomoko Kashiki; 1982 (age 43–44); Kyoto, Japan
- Education: Kyoto City University of Arts
- Occupation: Artist
- Known for: Painting

Tomoko Kashiki (樫木知子, Kashiki Tomoko; born 1982) is a Japanese artist based in Kyoto, Japan. She is known for her paintings, which often portray dreamlike scenes of lone female figures.

== Early life and education ==
Kashiki was born in Kyoto City, Japan.

In 2006, she earned a Bachelor of Fine Arts degree in oil painting and in 2008, a Master of Fine Arts degree in painting, both from Kyoto City University of Arts. In 2011, she earned a PhD in painting from Kyoto City University of Arts.

== Career ==
Despite her previous training in Nihonga, Kashiki's paintings are often compared to Surrealist works because of the "melted" quality of her subject matter and individualized technique.

Kashiki reinforces themes that are found elsewhere in contemporary Japanese art such as providing immersive visual escapes from society's uneasiness left from recent natural disasters like the 2011 Tōhoku earthquake and tsunami.

In 2011, she was featured in the "BYE BYE KITTY!!! Between Heaven and Hell in Contemporary Japanese Art" exhibition curated by David Elliott at the Japan Society in New York City, along with fifteen other contemporary Japanese artists.

=== Subject matter ===
The intricate details of Kashiki's work is said to be influenced by Buddhist art from the Heian period.

Kashiki primarily paints female figures and is said to also draw inspiration from Bijin-ga style of depicting beautiful women, a central theme from the ukiyo-e genre of Japanese art. Her concern with specific details of the body, such as wrinkled skin, are reflected in a series of drawings from 2014.

The settings in which these figures are placed are often "otherworldly backgrounds", which still appear to be loosely based on the city of Kyoto, Tomoko Kashiki's hometown. Interior spaces where she often situates her women are identifiable. The hallways, columns, windows, even electrical sockets provide a definitive sense of ground yet seemingly empty, varied, and flattened perspectives create "an imaginary and ethereal world with no specific temporal or geographic location".

=== Style ===
Kashiki carefully selects all of the elements of a painting based on a clear, "private philosophy of beauty". "...gesture, facial expression, pose, specific objects, background, location, situation, spacial [sic] composition, surface texture, line thickness, nexus of layers, degree of blurring" all become relevant considerations to her vision.

Fluid, organic and sensual elements like the effects of water are reoccurring themes in Kashiki's works, which she explains to be informed by her "fresh feeling of being alive". Dream, desire and yearning remain to be central motifs, which begin "bleeding into the surreal". Bodies and shadowy figures have unreal, distorted physiques – featuring excessively long, flowing limbs – a common characteristic to find in Surrealist art. Her settings are also seen as recognizably Surrealist in their vast, empty yet familiar nature.

=== Technique ===
Kashiki uses various painting mediums including acrylic, pastel, color pencil, and others. In some recent works, she has painted directly onto wooden panel. Since her graduate training, Kashiki began following a complex, ritualized process of her own. First sketched in pencil, her works are painted in acrylic, layer by layer onto a linen cloth mounted on large Chamfered wooden boards. Compositions are structured with overlapping, receding facets as she paints, sands and carves the surface of the panel, then repaints and pounces, layer over layer. This multi-step process has been seen as a physical articulation of Kashiki's own fleeting impressions – the "flickering", fleeting landscapes of emotions and memories in her mind. In this way, Kashiki's paintings have been considered "a manifestation of [her] inner landscape".
