= Kunié Sugiura =

Japanese photographer (born 1942)

Kunié Sugiura (杉浦 邦恵, Sugiura Kunie, born November 23, 1942) is a Japanese photographer, painter, and multimedia artist, living in New York City. In 2007 she won the Domestic Photographer Higashikawa Prize.

== Life and work ==
Sugiura was born in Nagoya, Japan. She moved to the United States in 1963 to study at the School of the Art Institute of Chicago where she received her B.F.A. in 1967.

In the 1980s, she adopted the classic black-and-white photogram technique as a means for her artistic expression.

== Personal life ==
She lives and works in New York City.

== Publications ==
=== Books by Sugiura ===
- Dark Matters/Light Affairs. New York, NY: Arts Management, 2000. ISBN 9780295980386. With essays by Bill Arning and Joel Smith.
- Artists and Scientists. Nazraeli, 2007. ISBN 978-1-59005-190-0.

=== Books with contributions by Sugiura ===
- I'm So Happy You Are Here. New York: Aperture, 2024. ISBN 9781597115537. A piece on each of 25 Japanese women photographers.

== Awards ==
- Artist's Fellowship, New York Foundation for the Arts, 1998
- Domestic Photographer Prize, Higashikawa Prize, 2007

== Exhibitions ==
=== Solo exhibitions ===
- Warren Benedek Gallery, New York City, 1972
- Dark Matters / Light Affairs, University of California, Davis, 2001
- Time Emit, Visual Arts Center of New Jersey, New Jersey, 2008
- Sugiura Kunié: Aspiring Experiments: New York in 50 Years, Tokyo Photographic Art Museum, 2018

=== Group exhibitions ===
- Vision and Expression, George Eastman House, Rochester, New York, 1969
- "Sex & Nature" were included in the Annual Exhibition of Painting, Whitney Museum of American Art, 1972

== Collections ==
Sugiura's work is held in the following permanent collections:

- Denver Art Museum
- Hirshhorn Museum and Sculpture Garden, Smithsonian Institution, Washington, D.C.
- Museum of Fine Arts, Boston
- Museum of Modern Art, New York
- Tokyo Photographic Art Museum
