= Emi Anrakuji =

Japanese blind photographer

- Born: 1963 (age 62–63); Tokyo
- Education: Musashino Art University
- Known for: Photography
- Website: www.emianrakuji.com

Emi Anrakuji (born 1963) is a Tokyo-based legally blind Japanese photographer who makes self-portraits. She has produced a number of books with Nazraeli Press and her work is held in the collection of the Museum of Fine Arts, Houston. In 2006 Anrakuji won the New Photographer Prize of the Higashikawa Prize in Higashikawa, Japan.

== Early life and education ==
Anrakuji was born in Tokyo, Japan, where she also studied oil painting at Musashino Art University. Soon after graduation, she was diagnosed with a brain tumor that ultimately caused the loss of sight in one eye. The other eye has congenital amblyopia. While recovering in bed from the tumor, she taught herself photography.

== Career ==
Anrakuji's photography subjects are consistently herself. "Anrakuji's oeuvre includes a series of photography projects in which she zooms in on her body, never revealing her face." HMMT? (How Many Miles To?) was her first photography series. A prize associated with the series brought her to the attention of Nazraeli Press, who subsequently released three of her books: Anrakuji (2006), e hagaki (2007) and IPY (2008).

Her work is frequently exhibited in solo shows at Miyako Yoshinaga Gallery in Chelsea, Manhattan.

== Publications ==
=== Books by Anrakuji ===
- Hmmt?. Osaka: Warp, 2005. ISBN 4860100646.
- Anrakuji. Portland: Nazraeli, 2006. ISBN 159005167X.
- e hagaki. One Picture Book 40. Portland: Nazraeli, 2007. ISBN 159005179-3. Edition of 500 copies.
- IPY. Portland: Nazraeli, 2008. ISBN 978-1-59005-218-1.
- Misho. Portugal: Shinto, 2017. Edited by Rui Ribeiral and Paulo Nozolino . With an essay by Anrakuji. Edition of 250 copies.
- Balloon Position. Kyoto: Araaka Art, 2019. ISBN 978-4-86541-102-7. Edition of 500 copies.

=== Books with others ===
- Witness #2 (Number Two): Daido Moriyama. Portland: Nazraeli, 2007. By Daidō Moriyama, Anrakuji, and Ken Kitano. ISBN 1590051998.

== Collections ==
Anrakuji's work is held in the following permanent collections:

- Museum of Fine Arts, Houston, TX: 1 print (as of 3 February 2022)

== Awards ==
- 2006: Winner, New Photographer Prize, Higashikawa Prize, Higashikawa, Hokkaido, Japan
- 2019: Shortlisted, Paris Photo–Aperture Foundation PhotoBook Awards, for Balloon Position
