= Mari Katayama =

Japanese multimedia artist

- 片山真理
- Born: 1987 (age 38–39); Saitama
- Education: Tokyo University of the Arts
- Known for: Sculpture, body art, photography
- Website: shell-kashime.com

Mari Katayama (Japanese: 片山 真理, Hepburn: Katayama Mari; born 1987) is a Japanese multimedia artist known for her sculpture and photography work. Her work focuses on themes such as body image, identity, and her experience as an amputee.

== Early life ==
Katayama was born 1987 in Saitama Prefecture, Japan. She later moved to Gunma Prefecture, where she grew up. She was born with congenital tibial hemimelia, which caused her to have club feet and a cleft left hand. As a result, she learned to sew at an early age to make clothes that accommodated her leg braces. At the age of 9, she opted to have her legs amputated and learned to walk with prosthetic legs.

Katayama began styling photographs of herself with her sculptures and posting them online on her Myspace page in high school. When starting out, she had her younger sister take photos of her.

As a teenager, she was inspired to begin drawing on her prosthetics after modeling in a show for fashion designer Tatsuya Shimada, who discovered her through her blog. Shimada said that he was looking for a unique model, and he saw Katayama as a "real girl who loves fashion" and thought there was potential for drawing on her prosthetics. Katayama ended up lengthening her prosthetics for the show, bringing her total height to 180 cm (5 ft 11 in). Later, she would create high heels for her prosthetics as well.

== Education ==
Katayama graduated with a B.A from the Department of Aesthetics and Art History, Faculty of Literature at Gunma Prefectural Women's University in 2010.

She also studied at Tokyo University of the Arts, where she was mentored by the late Japanese curator Takashi Azumaya. With Azumaya's encouragement, she began to work as an artist. She graduated with a master's degree in 2012.

== Themes ==
When describing her work Katayama writes,

"Who am I? This has always been a non-trivial question. Born with various developmental challenges, I had both legs amputated at the age of nine, and have since lived with prosthetics. The dolls and prosthetic legs that appear repeatedly in my work can be an attempt to objectify my own elusive body through the acts of measuring, disassembling, and re-joining. The objects that fill the safety zone that is my room give it the aspect of an armory."

== Career ==
=== Solo exhibitions ===
Her first solo exhibition was titled you're mine and was shown at the Traumaris gallery in Ebisu in 2014. The collection of self-portraits was inspired by studying her own body and her experience being an amputee.

A retrospective of her work, titled 19872017, was shown at Gateau Festa Harada, a candy factory and gallery, in 2017. Her show On the Way Home, which consisted of all new work, also took place in 2017 at The Museum of Modern Art, Gunma.

In 2019, she had her first UK solo show (titled Broken Heart) at White Rainbow, a gallery in London that focuses on contemporary Japanese artists.

In 2021, she presents several works, including her series In the Water at Maison Européenne de la Photographie in France.

- 2017 "19872017", Gallery Gateau Festa Harada, Gunma
- 2017 "On the Way Home", The Museum of Modern Art, Gunma
- 2016 "Self-portrait and object", Runaiss Hall, Okayama
- 2016 "Artist in Rokku vol.3 Mari Katayama / bystander", Miyaura Gallery Rokku, Naoshima
- 2016 "Shadow Puppet - 3331 ART FAIR recommended artists", 3331 Arts Chiyoda Tokyo
- 2015 "25 days in Tatsumachi Studio", Robson Coffee (Arts Maebashi), Gunma
- 2014 "you're mine", Traumaris, Tokyo
- 2014 "Mari Katayama solo exhibition", Kitchen Gallery, Paris
- 2009 "Mari Katayama solo exhibition", Gallery J, Gunma
- 2008 "Mari Katayama solo exhibition", Slow Time, Gunm

==== First solo exhibition in the United States ====
From October 2019 to January 2020, Katayama displayed her photography, as well as a textile piece made of twine, pillows, pantyhose, seashells, and her own hair, at the University of Michigan Museum of Art. She spoke through an interpreter as part of the Penny Stamps Speaker Series. Her photographs for the show captured her in indoor and outdoor environments to "explore her identity by objectifying her body in her art".

=== Group exhibitions ===
Katayama's work has been shown in multiple group exhibitions, starting with the Gunma Biennale for Young Artists in 2005 when she was 18 years old.

Her first major arts fair appearance was at the Aichi Triennale 2013, Aichi Arts Center Nagoya. Her mixed media installation included found objects, dried flowers, prosthetics, apothecary jars, and photographs, among others.

In 2016, photographs from you're mine were included in Roppongi Crossing 2016: My Body, Your Voice (僕の身体、あなたの声, Boku no shintai, anata no koe) at Mori Art Museum in Tokyo. Her portrait for the exhibition, the theme of which was the human body and gender, featured her in lingerie without her prosthetics.

The following year, Katayama presented new works created after the birth of her daughter in Photographs of Innocence and of Experience – Contemporary Japanese Photography vol.14 at the Tokyo Photographic Art Museum.

In 2019, Katayama's work was featured in both the Arsenal and Central Pavilion exhibiting areas of the 58th Venice Biennale, an international art exhibition in Venice, Italy. Her work was also presented by Sage Gallery booth at Paris Photo later that year.

== Collections ==
Katayama's work is held in the following permanent collection:

- Princeton University Art Museum: a copy of her 2016 photograph Shadow puppet #007

== Reception ==
A review on Artsy by Alina Cohen commended her repurposing of traditional craft objects, and cinematic, glamorous imagery. Simon Baker of Tate Modern praised her use of "ideas about identity and performance" without being derivative.

She won the Higashikawa New Photographer Award in 2019 and the 45th Kimura Ihei Award in 2020.

== Personal life ==
Katayama is married and has one daughter, born in 2017. She lives in Gunma.
