= Miwa Yanagi =

Japanese artist

- Born: Kobe, Japan
- Education: Kyoto City University of Arts
- Style: Photography; Video; Performance Art
- Movement: Contemporary
- Website: www.yanagimiwa.net/e/

Miwa Yanagi (やなぎみわ, Yanagi Miwa) is a Japanese photographic artist who examines self-image and stereotypes of women in contemporary Japanese society. Yanagi was discovered by conceptual photographer Yasumasa Morimura, who noticed some of her work while borrowing her house as a set for a separate project.

== Biography ==
Miwa Yanagi was born in 1967 in Kobe, Japan. She completed her postgraduate course work at the Kyoto City University of Arts. Yanagi received two degrees at this university: one in crafts in 1989, then another in art in 1991. She worked mostly with fiber installation art pieces. It was only when she needed to photograph these works for documentation that she realized her skill at photography and decided to pursue this new line of art. One of her first ever photography pieces was titled White Casket(1993) and is now a part of her larger collection: Elevator Girls(1994). She is known mainly as a photographer and video artist. She creates an elaborate, and often costly, staged event using female models ranging in different ages. After the picture or video is taken, the image may be altered with computer graphics. Her artworks examines self-images and stereotypes of Japanese women in contemporary Japanese society.

Yanagi was influenced by a teacher in high school who was passionate for his artwork. She decided to go into art at Kyoto City University of Arts. After graduating from Kyoto City University of Arts, she began working as a teacher where she began to realize that she was not individualized but rather forced to play an ordinary role of a woman teacher. Her big break came when she was nominated to be in an exhibition in Germany in 1996 at the Kunsthalle in Frankfurt. It was here that her works were exhibited along with artists like Cindy Sherman and Jeff Wall. The international exposure to a commercial art market gave her major advantage over other Japanese artists. Because of the lack of a contemporary art market in Japan and her success in Germany in 1996 she decided to display her work overseas. Yanagi currently works and lives in Kyoto, Japan.

== Artwork ==
=== Elevator Girls ===
Yanagi's best known body of works is her first, Elevator Girls. With it, she focuses on themes of everyday life, self-identity, architecture, and employment in the world of girls who operate the elevators of Japanese department stores. Elevator Girls first started as performance piece early in her career. It was to represent and reflect on what Yanagi was going through at this time. The performance was about a young girl who works in a narrow box, who has to repeat the same task over and over again, day after day. The later photographs of Elevator Girls show women dressed similarly and who often show very little emotion. The switch from performance art to photography was because Yanagi wanted complete control in what was going on. These young models are all physically similar in body composition. The way they are posed shows that they are restricted on what they can do and where they can go, much as restrictions are placed on women culturally. In the photos the elevator girls stare at architectural design or consumer goods. The staring represents society's obsession with consumer goods. These standardized young women in her artwork series symbolized the capitalistic and patriarchal society of Japan and how the roles of women in the workforce of Japan is suppressed and idealized to serve and obey their male-dominated society.

=== My Grandmothers ===
My Grandmothers was next. The series focuses on how young girls from between 14 and 20 years old perceive and what they thought their life would be like in 50 years. If she liked the answer and felt inspired to work with it the interview was later photographed with models, some of whom came from the Elevator Girls series. (Note: The models for Yanagi's work come from different sources. She has an address in the magazine Ryūkō Tsūshin, where her works are usually published. She also gets help from friends and gets emails from people who want to be part of her work, mainly from people who attended the lectures Yanagi has given at different universities. (Wakasa).) During the interview process she asks her interviewees questions such as 'What kind of world do you want to see in 50 years? And how do you imagine yourself living in it?' She then eliminates those who seem to lack any real life experience. She believes that younger people restrict what they can do. When the age restriction is released, women are freer to express their wishes and desires. The more restricted a young girl feels today closely relates to the degree of freedom she will feel 50 years from now. After the interview is accepted, drawings are made. Then Yanagi photographs the scene she has imagined and put on paper. The photograph is then altered on a computer, to merge the girl's idea and Yanagi's surreal dream. The results show emotions ranging from sad to funny. A girl named Mie imagines that in 50 years she will be lonely, looking around a field of empty landscapes during a time of a cataclysm. One named Yuka believes she will be living somewhere on the U.S. coast without a care in the world and with a playboy for a lover. Along with each photo comes a verse based on the interviews and the photos.

=== Fairy Tales ===
In Yanagi's third popular series, Fairy Tales, she focuses on stories in which the main characters are usually simultaneously both old and young and deals with the relationships between the two ages. The stories are based on fairy tales told by the Brothers Grimm, which are often more gruesome and horrible than the watered-down versions told to children. The gruesome quality appealed to Yanagi and helped her show the difference between youth and old age. She first released the series in 2005 at the Hara Museum of Contemporary Art and Ohara Museum of Art. They are presented as large black-and-white photos. Yanagi abandons her computer here for more traditional methods. She also uses models who are not Japanese. Young mixed-raced girls are given wigs, makeup, and latex masks to look like old, witch-like, hags. What is left is a strange unresolved combination of an old woman with youthful limbs and appendages, confusing the distinction between old and young. For example, in the 2005 Snow White, a young girl can be seen looking into the mirror, but instead of a beautiful young lady looking back at her, she sees an old unattractive old lady. In a second example, Gretel, a young girl can be seen gnawing on the finger of an unseen witch. This leaves the viewer wondering which is the captor. This series is the complete opposite of Elevator Girls, where the models are shown as pretty, have little emotion and are similar.

=== Video ===
In the video Suna Onna (i.e. "sand woman", 2005) Yanagi shows the relationship between a child and her grandmother. The grandmother tells the granddaughter of her meeting with a sand woman as a child. It is meant to be a tale of transformation and the supernatural world. In other videos she shows uniformed women who change their surroundings with a wave of their hand.

In a follow-up piece to My Grandmothers, Yanagi interviews older generation grandmothers and asks them for memories of their grandmothers. In the video though, the listener cannot actually hear the grandmothers' voices. Instead they hear preschooler children's voices dubbed over the interview as they read aloud the grandmothers' responses. Yanagi thus links three different generations: the children, grandmothers, and the grandmothers' grandmothers. She titles this piece, Granddaughters (2004).

In a new show in 2010, Yanagi paired four older photographs from Fairy Tales alongside the unveiling of her newest 2010 video, Lullaby. This piece looks at the relationships between the young and old, using jumps, cuts, and slow motion edits in the video to stress the importance of time. The piece also juxtaposes enclosed vs open spaces, relating to the bigger picture of dream states and reality. The video depicts a younger woman resting her head on an older woman's lap. The age gap is apparent and exaggerated as they are both wearing masks that emphasize their youth or their old age. The video goes back and forth between the women engaging in fighting or wrestling and them resting by the fireplace. The roles reverse between who is resting and whose lap is being rested on after each fight. The fight scenes align well with her Fairy Tales installation which also depicts women fighting. The idea is that the scenes of rest show reality while one of the women is dreaming. The fighting scenes depict their dreams which sometimes occur outside of the fireplace room, or outside of reality. The video ends with a fight on a rooftop in which the two women join hands, and come together as they fall back into the fireplace room.

=== Performances ===
Although known more for photography and video, Yanagi also did performance pieces before she switched to photography. The main subject was what she was going through as a young woman in Japan. Elevator Girls was originally a performance piece. Yanagi also did another performance piece in which she hired someone who was to show contemporary art in a museum to visitors as a real guide would. Yanagi gave them a script on what to say and at what points during the tour that they were supposed to perform certain gestures. The guide was totally believable in this performance, wearing the same uniform as regular tour guides and speaking in the same manner. People seemed more interested in the tour guide than the actual art work. Some people even left the museum after the guide finished speaking. In Yanagi's view the performance is about the feeling of pleasure and the experience. It was more about the performance by the guide than actual artwork in the museum. Yanagi's current subjects are the lives of women and how they are perceived in the modern world. Here she looks on how women are treated and viewed by society and also how women culturally view themselves.

In 2013, Zero Hour: Tokyo Rose's Last Tape was performed at the Japan Society in New York. Zero Hour deals with the story of Iva Toguri D'Aquino, a Japanese-American DJ for a propagandist radio program who was arrested upon return to the US in 1950 and wrongly found guilty of treason. Employing interpretive dance, projected images and traditional dialogue, Yanagi says Zero Hour "explores the role of media in the context of theatre".

== Exhibitions ==
In 1993 Yanagi held her first solo exhibition, and since 1996 her work has been exhibited in both solo and group shows throughout Europe and the United States.

Her solo shows include:

- her first show in 1993, in an exhibition in Art Space Niji, Kyoto
- Deutsche Guggenheim, 2004
- Miwa Yanagi. Sammlung Deutsche Bank, Neues Museum Weserburg Bremen (Bremen)
- Darkness of Girlhood and Lightness of Aging, Marugame Genichiro-Inokuma Museum of Contemporary Art, 2004
- The Incredible Tale of the Innocent Old Lady and the Heartless Young Girl, Hara Museum of Contemporary Art, August–November 2005
- Ohara Museum of Art, 2005
- Miwa Yanagi, NRW-Forum Düsseldorf (Düsseldorf), 2005
- Miwa Yanagi, Sammlung Deutsche Bank, Kunstverein Mannheim (Mannheim), 2005
- Madame Comet, Ohara Museum of Art, 2006
- Chelsea Art Museum, May–August 2007
- Museum of Fine Arts, Houston in 2008
- Arts Maebashi, Gunma Prefecture, Japan, April 19–June 23, 2019

Her group exhibitions include:

- "Art Now '94" Hyogo Prefectural Museum of Modern Art, Hyogo 1994
- "Future recollections" Kyoto Municipal Museum of Art, Kyoto, "Freeze" Espaço Cultural Sérgio Porto, Rio de Janeiro, Brazil in 2000
- "Complicity, Biennale de Lyon 2001 Prelude to 2003" Lyon France 2001
- "Still Motion: Liquid painting" Mie Prefectural Art Museum (National Museum of Art, Osaka, Tokyo Metropolitan Museum of Photography) "Tsubaki Kai Ten" Shiseido Gallery, Tokyo (all 2008)

== Collections ==
- Deutsche Bank

== Awards ==
- 1998
  - First Prize: Leopold Godowsky Jr. Color Photography Award (Photographic Resource Center at Boston University)
- 1999
  - VOCA Prize, The Vision of Contemporary Art '99 (the Ueno Royal Museum, Tokyo)
  - Kyoto City Artist Prize
  - Higashikawa Prize - New Photographer Prize (Higashikawa, Hokkaido)
- 2000
  - Sakuya-Konohana Prize (Osaka City)
- 2001
  - Kyoto Prefectural Artist Prize
- 2004
  - Hyogo Prefectural Artist Prize
- 2006
  - Takashimaya Art Prize
