= Michiko Kon =

Japanese photographer

- Born: 1955 (age 69–70); Kamakura, Kanagawa prefecture, Japan

Michiko Kon (今道子, Kon Michiko, born 1955) is a Japanese photographer. She was born in Kanagawa Prefecture and graduated from Sokei Art School in 1978. She attended Tokyo Photographic College from 1978 to 1980, after studying mainly painting and printmaking during her years at Sokei. The majority of her photographs are black and white prints with a minimalist background, and often mediate on themes such as death, sexuality, and beauty. She uses unique multimedia and is primarily recognized for her incorporation of sea creatures in her photographs, ranging from salmon roe, fish, octopus, and crabs. Her first exhibition, Still Life, took place in Tokyo at the Shinjuku Nikon Salon in 1985. In 1992 she had her first museum exhibition in the United States at the MIT List Visual Arts Center. She took a several-year hiatus to care for her aging mother before returning to her photographic career around 2014. Some of her more recent work was created in Mexico.

== Rewards and Accolades ==
Recipient of the Kimura Ihei Prize in 1991.

Kanagawa Prefectural Art Exhibition in 1994.
