= Hara Museum of Contemporary Art =

Museum in Japan

Coordinates: 35°37′15.7″N 139°44′9.8″E

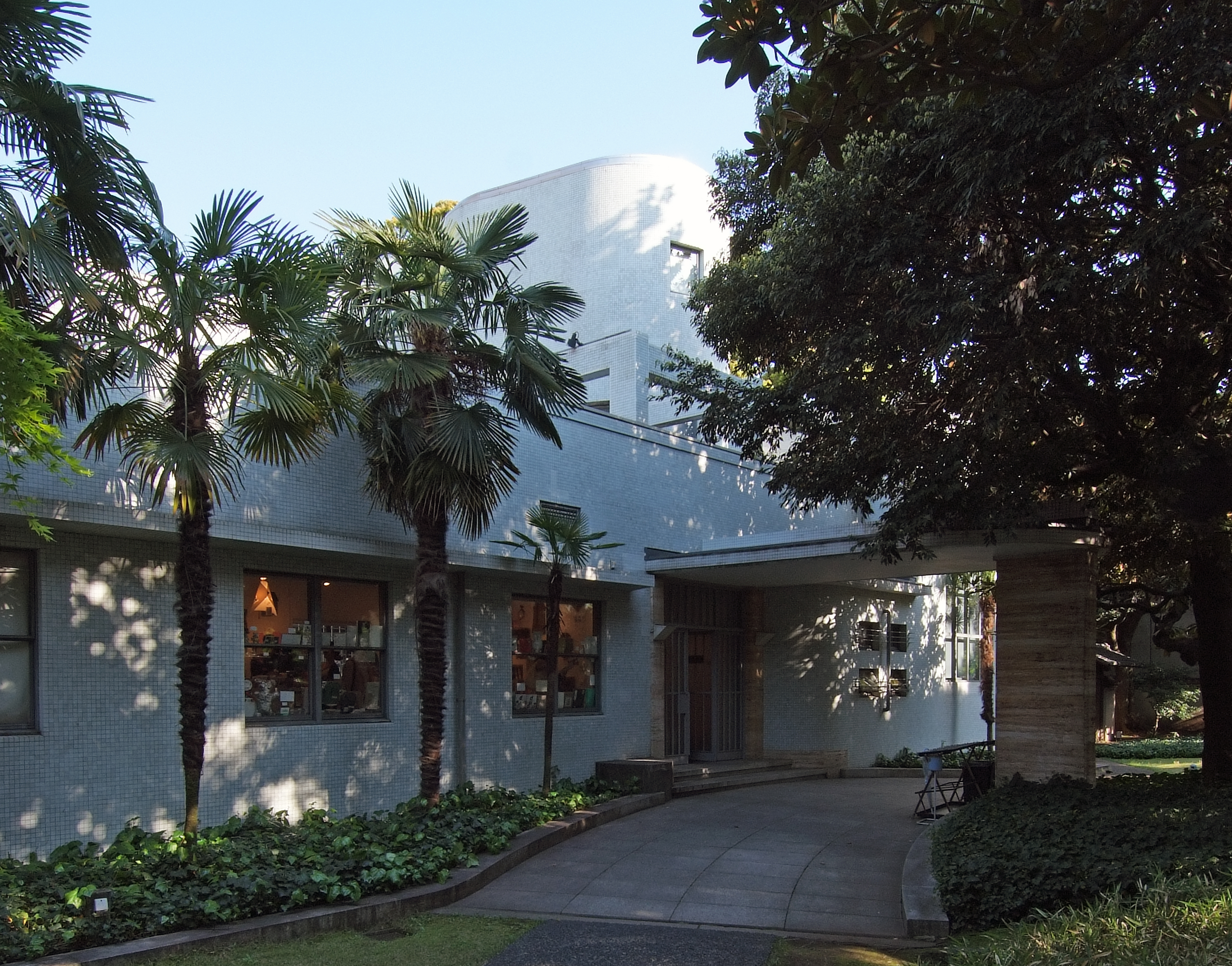
The Hara Museum of Contemporary Art, designed by Jin Watanabe in 1938

The Hara Museum of Contemporary Art (原美術館, Hara Bijutsukan) was one of the oldest contemporary art museums in Japan. The museum was in the Kita-Shinagawa district, in the Shinagawa area of Tokyo.

The building was originally built as a private mansion designed by Jin Watanabe in 1938 for the grandfather of current museum president and international collector Toshio Hara. Designed in a Bauhaus style, it is a rare example of early Shōwa period architecture . Following the war, it was used by the US and then served as the Embassy of the Philippines and the Embassy of Sri Lanka. In 1979, it was converted to a museum. It underwent a major renovation in 2008, including a new lighting system designed by Shozo Toyohisa. In November 2018, the Foundation Arc-en-Ciel announced that it would be closing the Shinagawa museum in 2020, leaving the Hara Museum ARC in Gunma Prefecture as the foundation's only museum.

The Shinagawa museum closed on January 11, 2021.

Its permanent collection had included works by Karel Appel, Alexander Calder, Buckminster Fuller, Yves Klein, Yayoi Kusama, Surasi Kusolwong, Aiko Miyawaki, Yasumasa Morimura, Daisuke Nakayama, Maruyama Ōkyo, Jackson Pollock, Jean-Pierre Raynaud, George Rickey, Mark Rothko, Cindy Sherman, Hiroshi Sugimoto, Jason Teraoka, Zhou Tiehai, Lee U-Fan, Andy Warhol, and Miwa Yanagi.

Its street address was: 4-7-25 Kita-Shinagawa, Shinagawa-ku, Tokyo 140-0001, Japan.
