= Ruiko Yoshida =

Japanese photojournalist (1938–2024)

Ruiko Yoshida (吉田 ルイ子, Yoshida Ruiko, 10 July 1938 – 31 May 2024) was a Japanese photojournalist. Her work focused on scenes of discrimination around the world.

== Early life ==
Yoshida was born in Muroran, Hokkaido, Japan. As an elementary school student she witnessed discrimination against some male Ainu students, and this influenced her later work. She graduated from Keio University in 1959.

After graduation she worked as an announcer for the NHK and Asahi Broadcasting. In 1961 she studied under a Fulbright scholarship at Ohio State University and Columbia University.

== Photography career ==
Yoshida earned a master's degree in photojournalism from Columbia in 1964. During her time in the United States, she took photographs of her daily life in Harlem. When she returned to Japan in 1971 she exhibited them, and later published them.

After her initial publication, she traveled to South Africa, Southeast Asia, and other places, where she photographed scenes of poverty and discrimination. In 1981 she directed a film titled Long Run. In 1989 she received an award from the Japan Congress of Journalists.

== Bibliography ==
- Yoshida, Ruiko (1972). Harlem : Atsui Hibi. Kodansha Ltd.
- Yoshida, Ruiko (1974). Harlem : Kuroi Tenshitachi. Kodansha Ltd.
