= Asako Narahashi =

Japanese photographer

- Born: 1959 (age 66–67); Tokyo, Japan
- Known for: Photography

Asako Narahashi (楢橋 朝子, Narahashi Asako; born 1959 in Tokyo) is a Tokyo-based Japanese photographer. She is known for her approach of taking photos from offshore and splitting the frame between water and land or sky. Her photographs are held in a permanent collection in San Francisco Museum of Art and The National Museum of Modern Art in Tokyo. In 1990, Narahashi opened the gallery 03FOTOS (1990-2001) to present her works. In 1996, she co-founded the photography magazine Main (1996-2000) with Ishiuchi Miyako.

== Select solo exhibitions ==
- half awake and half asleep in the water, Yossi Milo Gallery, New York (2008)
- Coming Closer and Getting Further Away, Tokyo Art Museum, Tokyo (2009)
- half awake and half asleep in the water, Festival Images Vevey, Switzerland (2016)
- A Retrospective, Asako Narahashi, Ibasho, Antwerp (2017)
- Sea Side Line, The Historical “Yukari no ie” House in Inage, Chiba (2018)
- Herno / Asako Narahashi at Herno, Herno Aoyama, DESIGNART Tokyo (2018)
- Dawn in Spring, PGI, Tokyo (2021)
- Drifting but never sinking, IG Photo Gallery, Tokyo (2021)
- Drifting but Never Sinking 02, IG Photo Gallery, Tokyo 2023
- 1961 They Were Standing There, PGI, Tokyo (2025)

== Select group exhibitions ==
- The Ongoing Power of Photography, Daegu Arts Center Gallery, 9th Daegu Photo Biennale, Korea (2023)
- I'm So Happy You Are Here, Palais De L'archevêché, Rencontres d'Arles, France (2024)
- I’m So Happy You Are Here: Japanese Women Photographers from the 1950s to Now, The Photographer's Gallery, London (24 June 2026 - 27 September 2026); International Center of Photography, New York (15 October 2026 - 11 January 2027).

== Publications ==
- NU E. (1997) ISBN 978-4-938628-27-7
- Asako Narahashi: Funiculi Funicula. Photographs 1998–2003 (2004) ISBN 978-4-902137-24-8
- Half Awake Half Asleep in the Water. (2007) ISBN 978-1-59005-215-0
- Ever After. (2013) ISBN 978-4-905254-02-7
- Gips. (2018) ISBN 978-4-905254-08-9
- Dawn in Spring. (2023) ISBN 978-4-905254-12-6
- I’m So Happy You Are Here: Japanese Women Photographers from the 1950s to Now (2024) ISBN 978-1-59711-553-7
