= Ryoko Suzuki =

Japanese photographer

Ryoko Suzuki (born 1970 in Hokkaido, Japan) is a contemporary Japanese artist, using photography as her main medium. Her work uses highly constructed images to comment on the designated social roles of women living in contemporary Japan.

In 1990 she graduated from Junior College of Art at Musashino Art University, Tokyo and in 1999 she graduated from Sokei Academy of Art and Design, Tokyo.

The photographs of the artist concern the homogenized standards of beauty on display in mainstream visual culture. Her photographs approach the issue of how women and girls are represented in society and the media, literally comparing her own image to cartoon sex objects of contemporary popular culture. In her series Anikora, Suzuki adapts the idol collage (aidoru koraju), often used to superimpose famous women's faces onto nude bodies. In the work she collages her own face over anime torsos. Her Blind triptych depicts the artist, with her face wrapped up and bound by a strip of blood-covered pigskin, to illustrate and symbolize Japanese women's oppression.

In 2007, her work was recognized through its inclusion in a major international survey, “Global Feminisms" at the Brooklyn Museum, New York. More recently, her work was featured in a 2018 group exhibition entitled "The Women Behind" at Jerusalem's Museum on the Seam.
