= Duck and cover =

Method of personal protection from a nuclear explosion

In the 1952 United States civil defense film, Duck and Cover, "Bert the Turtle" teaches schoolchildren how to protect themselves during a nuclear attack.

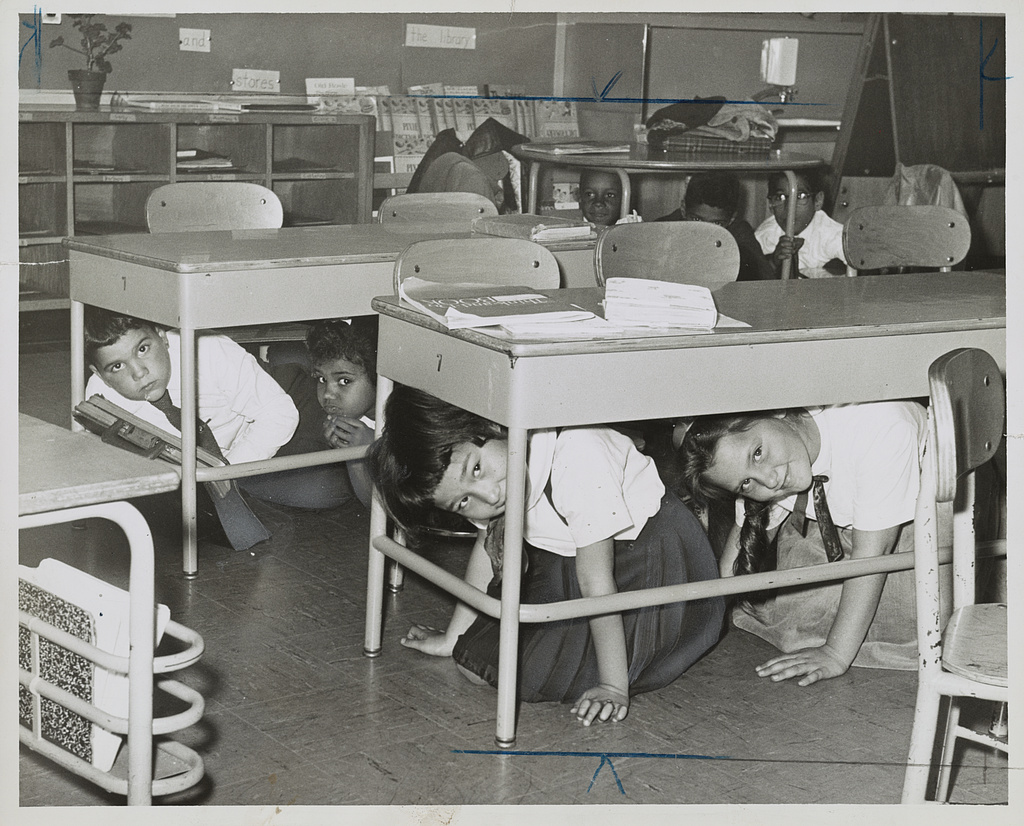
Duck and cover drill in a sсhool in Brooklyn in 1962

"Duck and cover" is a method of personal protection against the effects of a nuclear explosion. Ducking and covering is useful in offering a degree of protection to personnel located outside the radius of the nuclear fireball but still within sufficient range of the nuclear explosion that standing upright and uncovered is likely to cause serious injury or death. In the most literal interpretation, the focus of the maneuver is primarily on protective actions one can take during the first few crucial seconds-to-minutes after the event, while the film of the same name and a full encompassing of the advice also cater to providing protection up to weeks after the event.

The countermeasure is intended as an alternative to the more effective target/citywide emergency evacuation when these crisis relocation programs would not be possible due to travel and time constraints. Maneuvers similar, but not identical, to Duck and Cover are also taught as the response to other sudden destructive events, such as an earthquake or tornado, in the comparable situation where preventive emergency evacuation is similarly not an option, again, due to time constraints. In these analogously powerful events, Drop, Cover and Hold on likewise may help prevent injury or death if no other safety measures are taken.

== Procedure ==
=== During a surprise nuclear attack ===
Dropping immediately and covering exposed skin provide[s] protection against blast and thermal effects ... Immediately drop facedown. A log, a large rock, or any depression in the earth's surface provides some protection. Close eyes. Protect exposed skin from heat by putting hands and arms under or near the body and keeping the helmet on. Remain facedown until the blast wave passes and debris stops falling. Stay calm, check for injury, check weapons and equipment damage, and prepare to continue the mission.

— US Army field manual FM 3–4 Chapter 4.

Immediately after one sees the first flash of intense heat and light of the developing nuclear fireball, one should stop, get under some cover and drop/duck to the ground. There, one should assume a prone-like position, lying face-down, and to afford protection against the continuing heat of the explosion further cover exposed skin and the back of one's head with one's clothes; or, if no excess cover or cloth is available, one should cover the back of one's head and neck with one's hands.

Similar instructions, as presented in the Duck and Cover film, are contained in the British 1964 public information film Civil Defence Information Bulletin No. 5 and in the 1980s Protect and Survive public information series. Children in the Soviet Union likewise received almost identical classes on countermeasures, according to Inside the Kremlin's Cold War authors Zubok and Pleshakov.

In U.S. Army training, soldiers are taught to fall down immediately and cover their face and hands in much the same way as is described above.

In the classroom scene of the film, the rapid employment of school desks, as an improvised shelter following the awareness of the initial light flash, is a countermeasure primarily to offer protection from potential ballistic window glass lacerations when the slower moving blast wave arrived. However, in higher blast pressure zones, where partial-to-total building collapse may occur, it would also serve a similar role to that borne out from experience in urban search and rescue, where voids under the debris of collapsed buildings are common places for survivors to be found. More rigid examples of void-forming-tables to shelter under include the "Morrison indoor shelter", which was widely distributed by the millions in Britain as a protective measure against building collapse, brought about by blast pressures generated during the conventional bombing of cities in World War II. (Note: The building in which the table/Morrison shelter is located was advised to be as free from combustible materials as possible, as the potential of a fire in the debris, post-collapse, would be fatal to those sheltering inside.)

==== When warning is given ====
Under the conditions where some warning is given, one is advised to find the nearest bomb shelter, or if one could not be found, any well-built building to stay and shelter in place. Sheltering is, as depicted in the film, also the final phase of the "duck and cover" countermeasure in the surprise attack scenario.

=== Cursory analysis ===
The "duck and cover" countermeasure could save thousands. This is because people, being naturally inquisitive, would instead run to windows to try to locate the source of the immensely bright flash generated at the instant of the explosion. During this time, unbeknownst to them, the slower moving blast wave, would be rapidly advancing toward their position, only to arrive and cause the window glass to implode, shredding onlookers. In the testimony of Dr. Hiroshi Sawachika, although he was sufficiently far away from the Hiroshima bomb himself and was not behind a pane of window glass when the blast wave arrived, those in his company who were had serious blast injury wounds, with broken glass and pieces of wood stuck into them.

=== During earthquakes and tornadoes ===
Similar advice to "duck and cover" is given in many situations where structural destabilization or flying debris may be expected, such as during an earthquake or tornado. At a sufficient distance from a nuclear explosion, the blast wave produces similar results to these natural phenomena, so similar countermeasures are taken. In areas where earthquakes are common, a countermeasure known as "Drop, Cover, and Hold On!" is practiced. Likewise, in tornado-prone areas of the United States, especially those within Tornado Alley, tornado drills involve teaching children to move closer to the floor and to cover the backs of their heads to prevent injury from flying debris. Some US states also practice annual emergency tornado drills.

== History ==
The dangers of viewing explosions behind window glass were known of before the Atomic Age began, being a common source of injury and death from large chemical explosions. The Halifax Explosion of 1917, an ammunition ship exploding with the energy of roughly 2.9 kilotons of TNT, injured the eyes and faces of hundreds of people who stayed behind and looked out of their windows after seeing a bright flash, with 200 blinded by broken glass when the slower moving blast arrived. Every window in the city of Halifax, Nova Scotia, was shattered in this catastrophe of human error.

In the Record of the "Nagasaki A-bomb War Disaster", those close to the hypocenter (Matsuyama township), were described as all having been killed, with the exception of "a child who was in an air-raid shelter." A little further away, Professor Seiki of Nagasaki Medical School Hospital was building an air-raid dugout 400 m from the hypocenter of the detonation and survived. Chimoto-san, who was atop a distant hill that creates the valley in which Nagasaki is located, performed the similar "hit the deck" maneuver upon seeing the bomb drop, which was notably prior to the detonation. However despite having these few seconds of relatively unique warning, he did not stay on the ground for long enough after the flash subsided, and received some translational injuries due to prematurely standing-up again, at which point the slower moving blast wave swept past him and carried him with it for a few meters.

According to the 1946 book Hiroshima and other books which cover both bombings, in the days between the atomic bombings of Hiroshima and Nagasaki, some survivors of the first bombing went to Nagasaki and taught others about ducking after the atomic flash and informed them about the particularly dangerous threat of imploding window glass. As a result of this and other factors, far fewer died in the initial blast at Nagasaki as compared to those who were not taught to duck and cover. The general population however was not warned of the heat or blast danger following an atomic flash, due to the new and unknown nature of the atomic bomb. Many people in Hiroshima and Nagasaki died while searching the skies, curious to locate the source of the brilliant flash.

When people are indoors, running to windows to investigate the source of bright flashes in the sky still remains a common and natural response to experiencing a bright flash. Thus, although the advice to duck and cover is over half a century old, ballistic glass lacerations caused the majority of the 1000 human injuries following the Chelyabinsk meteor air burst of 15 February 2013. This response was also observed among people in the vicinity of Hiroshima and Nagasaki.

== Background ==
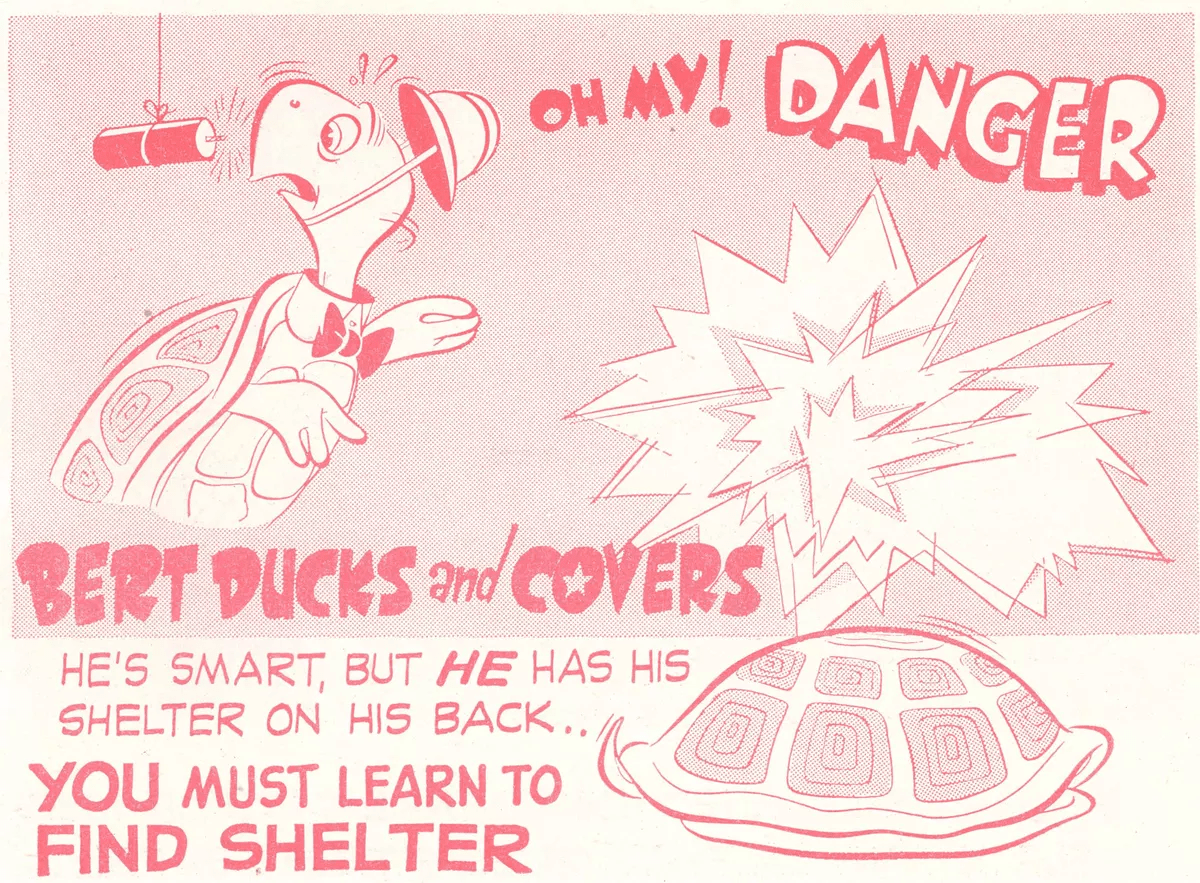
A Duck and Cover poster, featuring Bert the Turtle

The United States' monopoly on nuclear weapons was broken by the Soviet Union in 1949 when it tested its first nuclear explosive, the RDS-1. With this, many in the US Government, as well as many citizens, perceived that the United States was more vulnerable than it had ever been before. In 1950, during the first big Civil Defense push of the Cold War—and coinciding with the Alert America! initiative to educate Americans on nuclear preparedness, the adult-oriented Survival Under Atomic Attack was published. It contains "duck and cover" or more accurately, cover and then duck advice without using those specific terms in its Six Survival Secrets For Atomic Attacks section. 1. Try to Get Shielded 2. Drop Flat on Ground or Floor 3. Bury Your Face in Your Arms ("crook of your elbow"). The child-oriented film Duck and Cover was produced a year later by the Federal Civil Defense Administration in 1951.

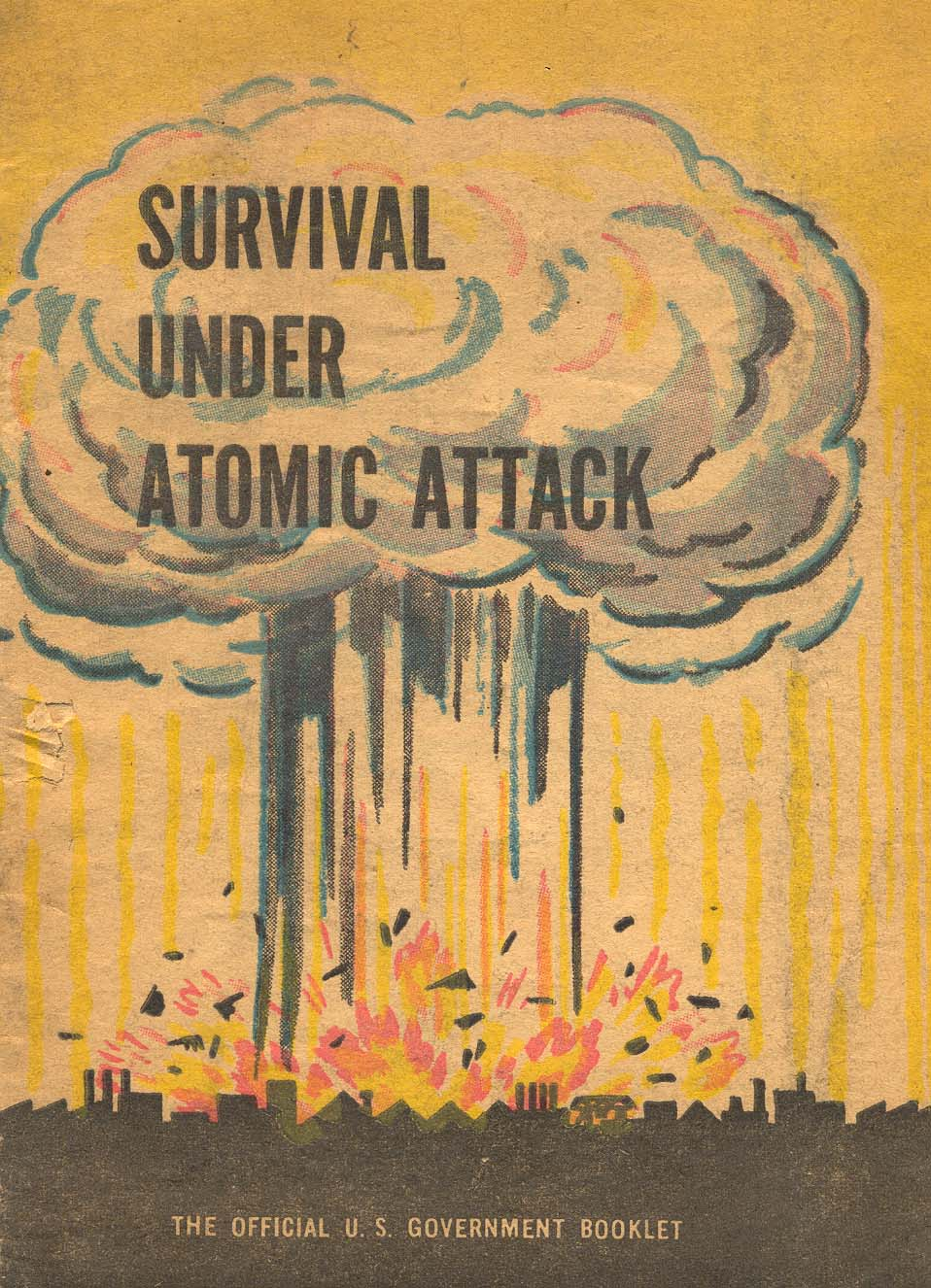
The adult-oriented Survival Under Atomic Attack issued in 1950, pre-dated the release of Duck and Cover in 1951-52. The booklet was accompanied by a companion film by the same name.

"Duck and cover" exercises quickly became a part of Civil Defense drills that every US citizen, from children to the elderly, was encouraged to practice so that they could be ready in the event of nuclear war.

Education efforts on the effects of nuclear weapons proceeded with stops-and-starts in the US due to competing alternatives. In a once classified, 1950s era, US war game that looked at varying levels of war escalation, warning and pre-emptive attacks in the late 1950s early 1960s, it was estimated that approximately 27 million US citizens would have been saved with civil defense education. At the time however the cost of a full-scale civil defense program was regarded as lesser in effectiveness, in cost-benefit analysis than a ballistic missile defense (Nike Zeus) system, and as the Soviet adversary was believed to be rapidly increasing their nuclear stockpile, the efficacy of both would begin to enter a diminishing returns trend. When more became known about the cost and limitations of the Nike Zeus system, in the early 1960s the head of the department of defense under president John F. Kennedy, Robert McNamara, determined the ineffectiveness of the Nike-Zeus system, especially in its benefit-cost ratio compared to other options. For instance, fallout shelters would save more Americans for far less money.

== Efficacy during a nuclear explosion ==
1954 test shot Nectar of Operation Castle produced a yield of 1.69 megatons and was conducted off the coast of Teiter island. Note the distinctive near instantaneous double flash, with the second appearing brighter than the sun, and the blast wave slowly, by comparison, spreading out turning the calm ocean water a frothy white when it arrives. The maximum average nuclear fireball radius is approximately 1.4 to 1.6 km (0.87 to 0.99 mi). The outdoor blast and flash burn LD50s would be around 8 and 12 km respectively. This assumes personnel did not take any prompt countermeasures, instead standing still, absorbing the entire light energy emitted over the ≈20 seconds of emission.

Within a considerable radius from the surface of the nuclear fireball, 0–3 kilometers—largely depending on the explosion's height, yield and position of personnel—ducking and covering would offer negligible protection against the intense heat, blast and prompt ionizing radiation following a nuclear explosion. Beyond that range, however, many lives would be saved by following the simple advice, especially since at that range the main hazard is not from ionizing radiation but from blast injuries and sustaining thermal flash burns to unprotected skin. Furthermore, following the bright flash of light of the nuclear fireball, the explosion's blast wave would take from first light, 7 to 10 seconds to reach a person standing 3 km from the surface of the nuclear fireball, with the exact time of arrival being dependent on the speed of sound in air in their area. The time delay between the moment of an explosion's flash and the arrival of the slower moving blast wave is analogous to the commonly experienced time delay between the observation of a flash of lightning and the arrival of thunder during a lightning storm, thus at the distances that the advice would be most effective, there would be more than ample amounts of time to take the prompt countermeasure of 'duck and cover' against the blast's direct effects and flying debris. For very large explosions it can take 30 seconds or more, after the silent moment of flash, for a potentially dangerous blast wave over-pressure to arrive at, or hit, one's position.

=== Blast effects ===
==== Outdoors ====
To elucidate the effects on lying flat on the ground in attenuating a weapons blast, Miyoko Matsubara, one of the Hiroshima maidens, when recounting the bombing in an interview in 1999, said that she was outdoors and less than 1 mile from the hypocenter of the Little Boy bomb. Upon observing the nuclear weapons silent flash she quickly lay flat on the ground, while those who were standing directly next to her, and her other fellow students, had simply disappeared from her sight when the blast wave arrived and blew them away.

Position of the body can have a considerable influence in protection from blast effects. Lying prone on the ground will often materially lessen direct blast effects because of the protective defilade effects of irregularities in the ground surface. Ground also tends to deflect some of the blast forces upward. Standing close to a wall, even on the side from which the blast is coming, also lessens some of the effect. Orientation of the body also affects severity of the effect of blast. Anterior exposure of the body may result in lung injury, lateral position may result in more damage to one ear than the other, while minimal effects are to be anticipated with the posterior surface of the body (feet) toward the source of the blast.

The human body is more resistant to sheer overpressure than most buildings, however, the powerful winds produced by this overpressure, as in a hurricane, are capable of throwing human bodies into objects or throwing debris at high velocity, both with lethal results, rendering casualties highly dependent on surroundings. For example, Sumiteru Taniguchi recounts that, while clinging to the tremoring road surface after the Fat Man detonation, he witnessed another child being blown away, the destruction of buildings around him and stones flying through the air. Similarly, Akihiro Takahashi and his classmates were blown by the blast of Little Boy by a distance of about 10 meters, having survived due to not colliding with any walls etc. during his flight through the air. Likewise, Katsuichi Hosoya had a near identical testimony.

==== Indoors ====
During the 2013 Chelyabinsk meteor explosion, a fourth-grade teacher in Chelyabinsk, Yulia Karbysheva, saved 44 children from potentially life-threatening ballistic window glass cuts by ordering them to hide under their desks when she saw the flash. Despite not knowing the origin of the intense flash of light, she ordered her students to execute a duck and cover drill. Ms. Karbysheva, who herself did not duck and cover but remained standing, was seriously lacerated when the explosion's blast wave arrived, and window glass blew in, severing a tendon in one of her arms; however, not one of her students, who she ordered to hide under their desks, suffered a cut. A follow-up study of the effects of the meteor airburst determined that the windows most prone to breaking when exposed to a blast overpressure are those of school buildings, which tend to be large in area.

While the bombings of Hiroshima and Nagasaki demonstrated that the urban area of glass breakage is nearly 16 times greater than the area of significant structural/building damage, although improved building codes since then may contribute to better building survival, there would be a higher likelihood of glass breakage and therefore potential injury/death for people near windows because many modern buildings have larger windows.

=== Flash & burn injuries ===
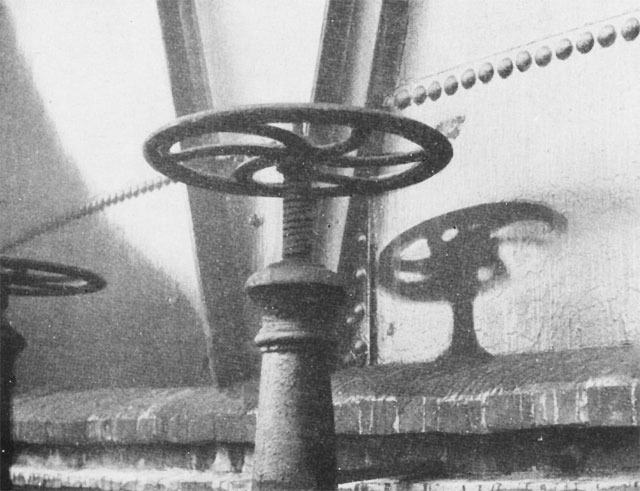
Anything that can cast a shadow will protect that which is shadowed from being burnt. In this case a valve protected a portion of the bitumen coated wall of a gas holder from having a line-of-sight with the nuclear fireball whereas all unshadowed surfaces were lightened, akin to a near instant "sun fading" of the coating. A large number of these permanent markings were used, by extrapolating backward, to determine the exact point of detonation in the sky.

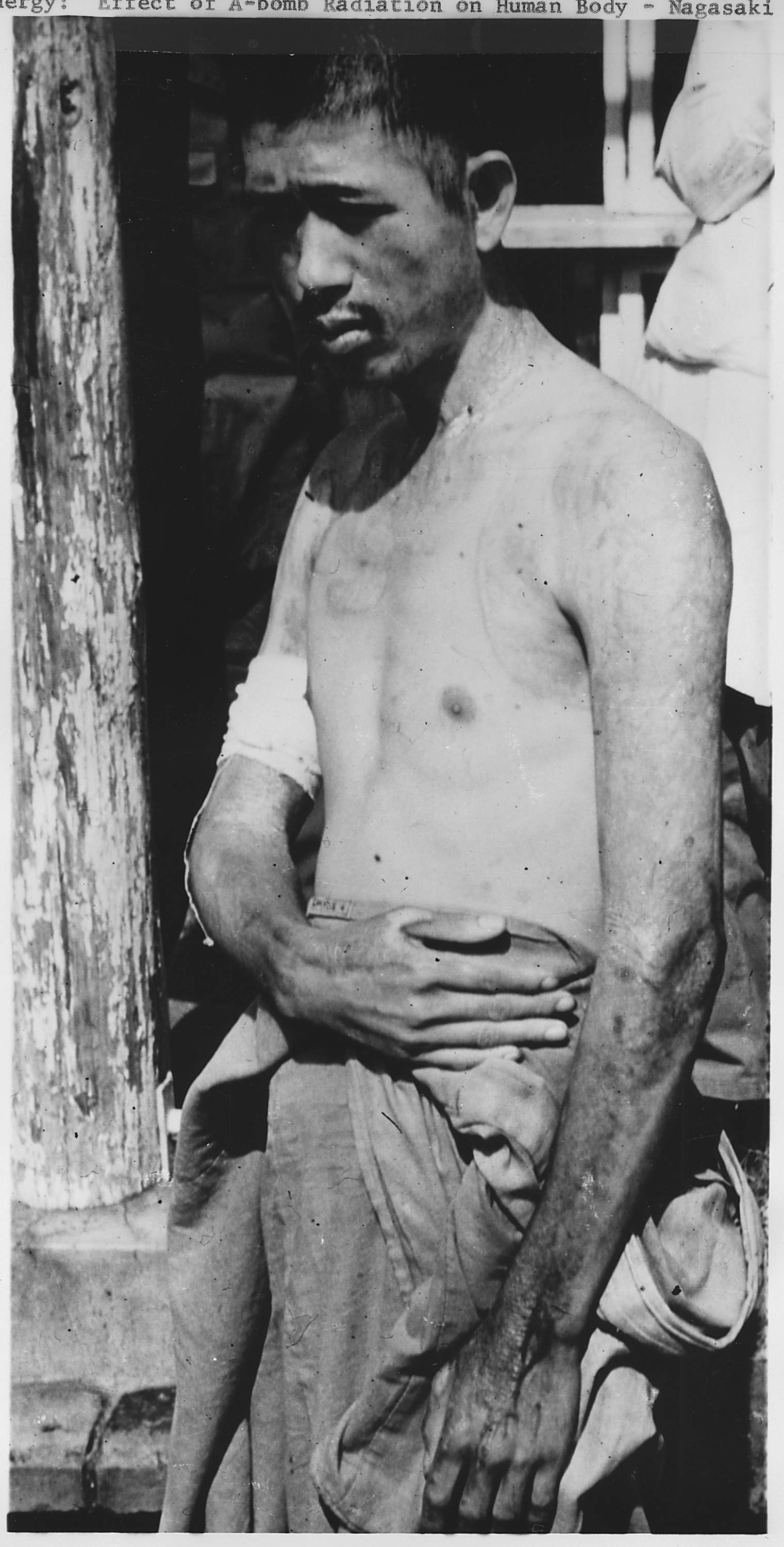
A man who was present at Nagasaki on August 9, 1945 during the dropping of the 20-kiloton Fat Man bomb; this photo displays 1st- and 2nd-degree burn injuries he experienced on his unclothed skin, the shoulder and arm, while the thin vest garment of clothing, a radiant barrier, that he was wearing at the time of the explosion completely protected his stomach and lower chest from experiencing similar burns. A clearer color restored version of this picture is also available.

The advice to cover one's exposed skin with anything that can cast a shadow, like the picnic blanket and newspaper used by the family in the film, may seem absurd at first when one considers the capabilities of a nuclear weapon. However, even the thinnest of barriers such as cloth or plant leaves would reduce the severity of burns on the skin from the thermal radiation with the flash light, similar in average emission spectrum/color to sunlight. The thermal radiation emits in the ultraviolet, visible light, and infrared range but with a higher light intensity than sunlight, and this combination of light rays is capable of delivering radiant burning energy to exposed skin areas. As the time-to-rise at peak and total duration of the emittance pulse of this burning thermal radiation is both prolonged and increases with larger explosive yield, it is usually at least a few seconds long for all high yield stockpiled weapons, creating the potential for protective countermeasures.

High importance is given to closing eyelids and covering the eyes as temporary or permanent flash blindness is a risk potential without this covering, especially at night.

A photograph taken about 1.3 km from the hypocenter of the Hiroshima bomb explosion showed that the shadowing effect of leaves from a nearby shrub protected a wooden utilities pole from charring discoloration due to the burst of thermal radiation; the rest of the telephone pole, which was not under the protection of the leaves, was charred almost completely black. The difference in required flash-energy necessary to produce essentially immediate, though transitory, non-propagating flaming, and that required to achieve a continued self-sustained propagating flaming are orders of magnitude in difference for most combustible materials. In the case of untreated timber it is largely dependent on the depth of char. While the propagating fires in both Japanese cities were almost exclusively ignited by the blast wave overturning charcoal cooking-braziers and similar secondary events, thermal flash-fires from untreated fabric and timber in the urban environment is considered potentially the widest destructive effect of the higher yield explosive devices. The Nevada test site used for testing nuclear devices had a dry desert environment with low humidity, which repeatedly demonstrated the flash-combustion effect during tests. Many investigative films made on location there, such as The House in the Middle and others, focused on the combustion of fabrics and clothing.

In the only human accounts at these high luminous intensities that are not of the more common Arc flash accidents, a number of the Hiroshima Maidens survived despite their close proximity to the explosion and in a range where the flash-fire of their customary Japanese summer attire, made of thin kimono cloth, was near instantaneous. As their clothing combusted, some of the Maidens performed an incomplete stop, drop and roll in an effort to extinguish the flames.

=== Initial nuclear radiation ===
While not designed for those faced with low-yield neutron bombs or for those who are, in general, so close to the nuclear fireball that prompt/initial radiation would be life-threatening in the short-medium term, ducking and covering would nevertheless slightly reduce exposure to the initial gamma rays, specifically the portion emitted after the first flash of visible light. The initial gamma rays are defined as those emitted from the fireball & following mushroom cloud which can reach personnel on the ground for a total of approximately 1 minute, at which point the intensity of the radiation has diminished and the atmosphere itself is thick enough to act as full shielding.

As approximately half of these gamma rays are emitted in the first second and the other half, over the following 59 alongside gamma rays being mostly emitted in a straight line, people lying on the ground will more likely have obstacles serving as radiation protection such as building walls, foundations, car engines, etc. between their bodies and the radiation emitted from both the fireball and the accompanying lower levels of radiation that continue to arrive at the ground for about 1 minute, during the mushroom cloud phase, which is termed "cloudshine". It would also give protection from the even smaller fraction of radiation that changes direction and is randomly reflected and scattered by the air/"skyshine". Approximately "One and one half inches"/37 mm of steel will reduce gamma dose by half. Its half-value thickness.

The effective gamma ray energy of the cloudshine is not especially high, 200 KeV.

Unlike the relatively low-yield, or low explosive energy "A-bombs" dropped on Hiroshima and Nagasaki, which did result in a sizable proportion of injuries from prompt radiation, higher yield "hydrogen bombs" (thermonuclear weapons) are not expected to result in very many such injuries – as the range at which the ionizing radiation from higher yield devices is of primary concern, is already well inside the hyper-lethal blast and flash burn areas.

=== Delayed nuclear radiation, "fallout" ===
Apart from the intrinsic "prompt effects" of nuclear detonations, that of thermal flash, blast and initial radiation releases, if any part of the fireball of the nuclear detonation contacts the ground, in what is known as a surface burst, another, comparatively slowly increasing, radiation hazard will also begin to form in the immediate area.

Putting aside the possibility of the detonation occurring during an already established heavy rain-storm, the formation of this life-threatening "delayed nuclear radiation" manifests only when the altitude, or "height of burst" of the explosion, is such that both the fireball and the buoyant updrafts it creates, sufficiently heats and lifts the soil that was below it into the core of the mushroom cloud. Once there, the very hot radioactive isotope products of the nuclear reactions that produced the explosion, begin to coalesce with the cooler and denser soil. Upon cooling, this mixture begins to locally fall-out or precipitate-out of the mushroom cloud, falling back to the surface of the earth, near to the point of detonation, over the next few minutes and hours.

While the duck and cover countermeasure, in its most basic form, offers a small to negligible protection against fallout, the technique assumes that after the effects of the blast and initial radiation subside, with the latter of which being no longer a threat after about "twenty seconds" to 1 minute post detonation, a person who ducks and covers will realize when it is wise to cease ducking and covering (after the blast and initial radiation danger has passed) and to then seek out a more sheltered area, like an established or improvised fallout shelter to protect themselves from the ensuing potential local fallout danger, as depicted in the film.

After all, "Duck and Cover" is a first response countermeasure only, in much the same way that "Drop, Cover and Hold On" is during an earthquake, with the advice having served its purpose once the earthquake has passed, and possibly other dangers—like a tsunami or fallout—may be looming, which then require movement to high ground and radiation protection, respectively.

However, if such a shelter is unavailable, the person should then be advised to follow the Shelter in Place protocol, or if given, emergency evacuation advice. Evacuation orders would entail exiting the area completely by following a path perpendicular to the wind direction and therefore perpendicular to the path of the fallout plume. Taking upper atmospheric winds into account, surface winds alone are not to be depended upon as indicative of the direction of fallout movement. "Sheltering in place" is staying indoors, in a preferably sealed tight basement, or internal room, for a number of hours, with the oxygen supply available in such a scenario being more than sufficient for 3+ hours in even the smallest average room, under the assumption that the improvised seal is perfect, until carbon dioxide levels begin to reach unsafe values and necessitate room unsealing for a number of minutes to create a room air change.

In the era the advice was originally given, the most common nuclear weapons were weapons comparable to the US Fat Man and Soviet Joe-1 in yield. The most far-reaching dangers that initially come from the nuclear explosion of this, and higher, yield weapons as airbursts, are the initial flash/heat and blast effects and not from fallout. This is due to the fact that when nuclear weapons are detonated to maximize the range of building destruction, that is, maximize the range of surface blast damage, an airburst is the preferred nuclear fuzing height, as it exploits the mach stem phenomenon. This phenomenon of a blast wave occurs when the blast reaches the ground and is reflected. Below a certain reflection angle the reflected wave and the incident wave merge and form a reinforced horizontal wave; this is known as the 'Mach stem' (named after Ernst Mach) and is a form of constructive interference and consequently extends the range of high pressure. Air-burst fuzing also increases the range that people's skin will have a line-of-sight with the nuclear fireball. However, as a result of the high altitude of the explosion, most of the radioactive bomb debris is dispersed into the stratosphere, with a great column of air therefore placed between the vast majority of the bomb debris/fission reaction products and people on the ground for a number of crucial days before it falls out of the atmosphere in a comparatively dilute fashion. This "delayed fallout" is henceforth not an immediate concern to those near the blast. On the other hand, the only time that fallout is rapidly concentrated in a potentially lethal fashion in the local/regional area around the explosion is when the nuclear fireball makes contact with the ground surface, with an explosion that does so, being aptly termed a surface burst. For example, in the Operation Crossroads tests of 1946 on Bikini Atoll, using two explosive devices of the same design and yield, the first, Test Able (an air burst) had little local fallout, but the infamous Test Baker (a near surface shallow underwater burst) left the local test targets badly contaminated with radioactive fallout.

Widespread radioactive fallout itself was not recognized as a threat among the public at large before 1954, until the widely publicized story of the 15-megaton surface burst of the experimental test shot Castle Bravo on the Marshall Islands. The explosive yield of the Castle Bravo device the Shrimp was unexpectedly high and therefore correspondingly higher amounts of local fallout were produced. When this arrived at their location carried by the wind, this caused the 23 crew members on a Japanese fishing boat known as the Lucky Dragon to come down with acute radiation sickness with varying degrees of seriousness and due to complications in the treatment of the ship's radio operator months after the exposure, resulted in his death.

It is, however, unlikely that a well-funded belligerent with nuclear weapons would waste their weapons with fuzing to explode below or on the surface, as both test shot Baker and Castle Bravo were respectively. Instead, to maximize the range of city blast destruction and immediate death, an air burst is preferred, as the ≈500 meter explosion heights of the only nuclear weapons used on cities, Little Boy and Fat Man also attest to. Moreover, with air bursts the total amount of radiation contained in the fallout, in units of activity/becquerel, is somewhat less than the total that would be released from a surface or subsurface burst, as in comparison, depending on the height of burst, little to no neutron activation or neutron induced gamma activity of soil occurs from air bursts. Therefore, the initial danger from concentrated local/'early' fallout (which takes on the color of the soil around the fireball, commonly with a dusty pumice or ash-like appearance, as experienced by the crew of the Lucky Dragon) remains low in a global nuclear war scenario. Instead the fallout most likely to be encountered by most survivors in this scenario is expected to be the less dangerous but widely spread global/'late' fallout. An air burst at optimum height will produce a negligible amount of early fallout.

A notable comparison to underline this is found when one compares the 50 megaton air-burst Tsar Bomba, which produced no concentrated local/early fallout and thus no known deaths from radiation, with the surface burst of the 15 megaton Castle Bravo, which in comparison, due to the local fallout produced, was implicated in the death of 1 of 23 crew on the Lucky Dragon and made the entire Bikini Atoll unfit for further nuclear testing until enough time elapsed and the intensity of the radiation field had decayed to acceptable levels. (Note: By 1958, a total of 23 nuclear devices were exploded on or near the atoll, with the majority occurring after the 1954 Operation Castle series, resulting in a total of about 42 megatons of pure fission product fallout being generated around the atoll. This made permanent above ground habitation without remediation unwise for a decade or so; it was thus resettled in 1968. The inhabitants lived there again from 1968 to 1978, abandoning the atoll in 1978. As of 2014, the atoll has had infrequent inhabitants since the 1990s, mainly for tours – a return to permanent safe habitation would require locally produced and consumed plant food to be grown with fertilizer, or alternatively, only imported plant food to be eaten.)

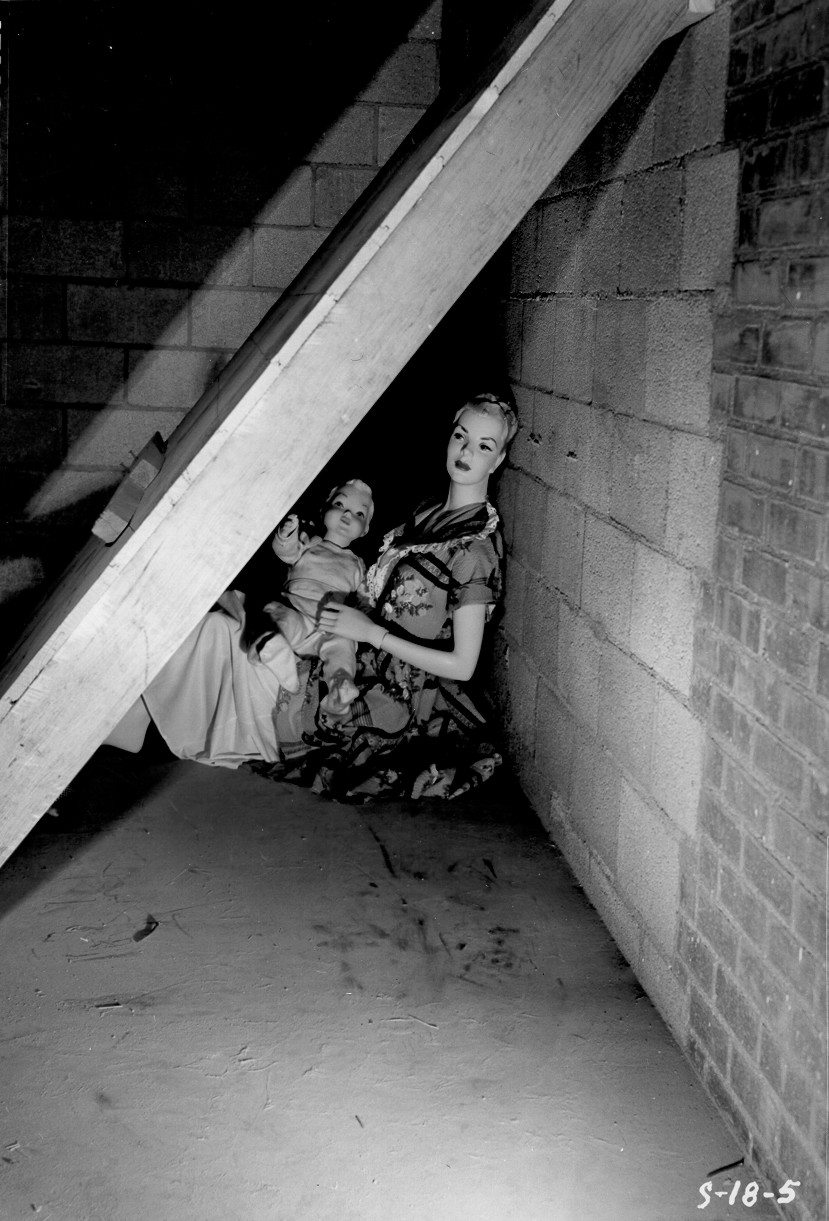
An Operation Doorstep mother and daughter mannequin pair in an improvised basement lean-to shelter prior to testing in Upshot-Knothole Annie. To shelter-in-place in such an area would offer, in a number of outdoor dose rates, an adequate fallout radiation protection factor (PF) or "dose reduction factor" of 20 or more. More effective basement spaces did/do exist however, of "10 million" homes assessed in 1968, 500,000 US basements were found to have a PF-40.

Furthermore, regardless of if a nuclear attack on a city is of the surface or air-burst variety or a mixture of both, the advice to shelter in place, in the interior of well-built homes, or if available, fallout shelters, as suggested in the film Duck and Cover, will drastically reduce one's chance of absorbing a hazardous dose of radiation. A real-world example of this occurred after the Castle Bravo test where, in contrast to the crew of the Lucky Dragon, the firing crew that triggered the explosion safely sheltered in their firing station until after a number of hours had passed and the radiation levels outside fell to dose rate levels safe enough for an evacuation to be considered. The comparative safety experienced by the Castle Bravo firing crew served as a proof of concept to civil defense personnel that shelter in place (or "buttoning up" as it was known then) is an effective strategy in mitigating the potentially serious health effects of local fallout.

The minimum typical protection factor of the fallout shelters in US cities is 40 or more. In many cases these shelters are nothing more than the interior of pre-existing well-built buildings that have been inspected, and following their protection factors being calculated, re-purposed as fallout shelters.

A protection factor of at least 40 means that the radiation shielding provided by the shelter reduces the radiation dose experienced by at least 40 times that which would be experienced outside the shelter with no shielding. "Protection factor" is equivalent to the modern term "dose reduction factor".

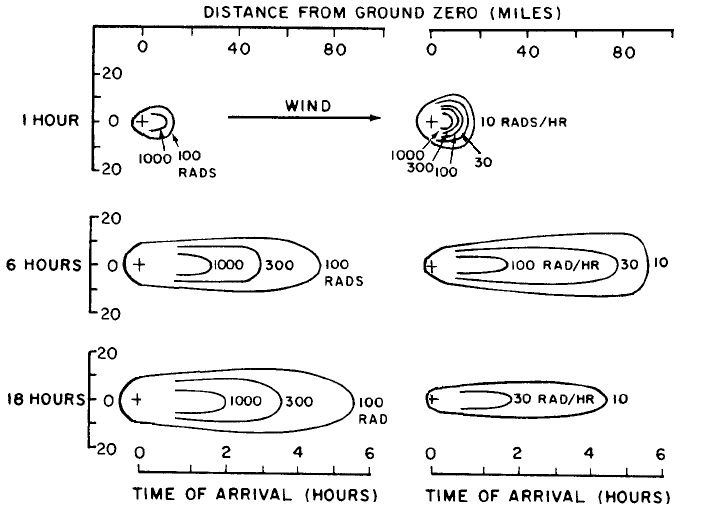
In units of rads, this is a simplistic model (Gaussian) of a wind-blown fallout map, which depicts the unshielded ground level fallout gamma ray dose and dose rate contours expected to follow a 2 megaton land surface burst detonation, with 1 megaton of the yield coming from fission reactions. Because of radioactive decay, the dose rate contours (on the right) contract after fallout has arrived, but the total absorbed dose contours (left) continue to grow. A similar color version of the right panel, dose rate contour plot, for a 0.1 to 10 kiloton surface burst is also available. Acutely dangerous regions of fallout are accompanied by fallout particles which are large enough to be detected by eye during its falling out/deposition, that is, they are equal to or larger than the size of dust. All of the ARS deaths following the Chernobyl accident were due to external beta burns. The beta particle to gamma energy ratio is usually greater than 3 in the timeframe of fallout with the greatest threat to life. Protection from physical contact with the dust therefore greatly reduces radiation exposure. The beta decaying uranium-237 and neptunium-239, that are generated from the neutron capture of U-235 and Pu-239 respectively, are regarded as the leading hazardous radioisotopes in the first hour-to-week period following nuclear fallout, with Np-239 dominating "the spectrum for several days".

During the first hour after a nuclear explosion, radioactivity levels drop precipitously. Radioactivity levels are further reduced by about 90% after another 7 hours and by about 99% after 2 days. An accurate rule of thumb, applicable in the time-period of days to a few weeks post-detonation which approximates the radioactive dose rate generated by the decay of the myriad of isotopes present in nuclear fallout, is the "7/10 rule". The rule states that for each 7-fold increase in time the dose rate drops by a factor of 10. For example, assuming the fallout process has ended 24 hours post detonation and the dose rate would be lethal if a few hours of exposure occurred, 50 roentgens per hour, then 7 days after detonation the dose rate will be 5 R/hr and 49 days after detonation (7×7 days) the dose rate will be 0.5 R/hr at which point no special precautions would need to be taken and venturing outside into that dose rate for an hour or two would pose a close to negligible health hazard, thus permitting an evacuation to be done with acceptable safety to a known contamination free zone. Following a surface-burst nuclear detonation, approximately 80 percent of the fallout would be deposited on the ground during the first 24 hours.

Some agencies that promoted "evacuate immediately" guidance as a response to potentially lethal fallout arriving, advice which may have been influenced by these agencies assuming simplistic single wind-driven cigar/Gaussian shaped fallout contours would be representative of reality, have since retracted this advice. This can actually result in higher radiation exposures as it would put people outdoors and in harm's way when the radiation levels would be highest. The Modeling and Analysis Coordination Working Group (MACWG) – which was set up to resolve conflicting advice given by various agencies, has reaffirmed that the best blanket advice that would reduce the number of casualties by the greatest amount is: "Early, adequate sheltering followed by informed, delayed evacuation."

Expert advice published in the 2010 document Planning Guidance for Response to a Nuclear Detonation is to shelter in place, in an area away from building fires, for at least 1 to 2 hours following a nuclear detonation and fallout arriving, and the greatest benefit, assuming personnel are in a building with a high protection factor, is sheltering for no less than 12 to 24 hours before evacuation. Therefore, sheltering for the first few hours can save lives. Indeed, death and injury from local fallout is regarded by experts as the most preventable of all the effects of a nuclear detonation, being simply dependent on if personnel know how to identify an adequate shelter when they see one and enter one quickly, with the number of potential people saved being cited as in the hundreds of thousands. Or even higher if the remaining occupants of the city are made aware of the contaminated areas, by emergency systems, within hours of the event's aftermath. In 2009 to 2013 a further iteration on sheltering-in-place was made to determine the optimal improvised fallout-shelter-residence-times following a nuclear detonation, with computer analysis, and including a summary of prior studies and guidance. It was found that individuals should quickly get into the best intact building at least under 5 minutes distant in travel time following the detonation and they should stay there for at least 30 minutes before venturing out to find a shelter with a higher protection factor but that is a greater travel time away than 10 minutes. However, although this would be effective in cases where the initial building protection factor is less than about 10, it requires a high degree of individual situational awareness that may be optimistic to assume following the shock of a nuclear detonation. If a building with a PF of 20 or more is nearby, such as the fallout shelters depicted in the film, in the vast majority of fallout circumstances, it would not be advisable to leave it until 3+ hours have elapsed following the initial arrival of the local fallout.

Following a single IND (improvised nuclear device) detonation in the US, the National Atmospheric Release Advisory Center (NARAC) would, within minutes to at most hours, after the detonation have a reliable prediction of the fallout plume size and direction. When armed with this prediction they would then begin attempting to corroborate this with readings from radiation survey meter equipment that would fly over close to the ground in the affected area by means of helicopter or drone (UAV) aircraft on material intelligence gathering missions, which would also follow within tens of minutes to at most hours after the detonation. (Note: As this ground hugging fly over has the potential to be mistaken for airlift rescue attempts, which are common after other natural disasters, survivors should not exit shelter unless absolutely necessary in the time period before being informed of the fallout situation, or alternatively, stay in shelter until sufficient time has elapsed, +24 hrs for a delayed evacuation to take place.)

Once a general outline and direction of the fallout is determined, disseminating this information to citizens sheltering-in-place would soon follow, by means of loudspeaker, radio, cell phone etc., with a "Fallout App" containing maps for smart phones being regarded as an area of interest so that survivors do not inadvertently evacuate downwind further into harm's way. A number of questions the affected public are likely to have after a nuclear detonation have been compiled and pre-answered to help communications in the immediate aftermath.

=== Nuclear electromagnetic pulse, non-lethal ===
In respect to the other non-lethal weapon effects from an IND detonated on or near the surface, the detonation's blast wave would likely produce a momentary electric grid blackout due to the loss of a large portion of a city's electrical equipment drawing power/electrical load, while the electromagnetic pulse (EMP) from a surface/ground-burst explosion would cause little damage outside the blast area, so cell phone towers that survive the blast should be capable of carrying communications. But if communications during the 9/11 attacks or after a major hurricane are anything to go by and the cell phone network towers survive, the service would be overloaded (a mass call event) and thereby made useless soon after; however, if prior arrangements between the cell network and emergency responders are made to give them priority and bar access to all other individuals, then it may be an effective service.

The Civil Defense (CD) shelters, as depicted in the film, were stocked for such an eventuality. They contained among other things, at least one ruggedized CDV-715 radiation survey meter and one CD emergency radio receiver which would respectively be used to facilitate a safe delayed evacuation, regardless of outside help though if communications continued, the radio receiver was to inform them of the outside situation as it developed.

== Long-term survival ==
The dubious assumption that "only the cockroaches" would survive the post-war fallout environment was frequently used in an attempt to criticize Duck and Cover during the height of the Cold War, contextually at a time when discussion of a total war involved the much greater US-Soviet arsenal of nuclear weapons that were then in existence. However even at that time, this assumption was shown to be misled, as scientifically detailed in areas including the 1988 book Would the Insects Inherit the Earth and Other Subjects of Concern to Those Who Worry About Nuclear War.

In material terms, the primary life-threatening risk survivors and downwinders could face in the long-term after a nuclear explosion or war, is the "nuclear famine" issue, the potential continuation of hostilities by conventional warfare and radioactive contamination of the food and water supplies, disrupting the normal distribution and consumption, of these vital goods.

Cold War continuity of government planners and civil defense organizations in general have always had this disruption, or "nuclear famine" issue in mind, as widespread infrastructure destruction producing starvation conditions was also seen during and after WWII. Papers such as On Reorganizing After Nuclear Attack, and Survival of the relocated population of the U.S. after a nuclear attack by Nobel Prize winner, Eugene Wigner, detail the thought and attention that went into long-term survival, relocation and reconstruction.

Numerous human and agricultural decontamination countermeasures exist for the two most persistent and biologically significant isotopes, cesium-137, strontium-90 and long-lived fallout contamination in general, with the most visible and immediate act that will prevent a potentially large dose to the public, taking the form of using shielded bulldozers to skim off the layer of topsoil that the fallout had settled on, a restorative practice that was fielded upon the creation of Lake Chagan. The creation of human decontamination tents at the entrances of buildings and when lower levels of risk exist, the use of clean room air showers as a form of contamination control to prevent the spread of radionuclides that adhere to dust, into building interiors, would also be advisable to reduce the elevated risk of radiation induced cancer that would otherwise occur. Air showers may be paired with electrostatic precipitators to attract the dust to collection plates, forestalling a re-suspension that may otherwise be inhaled. Moreover use of the open access radioecology research on decontamination and conventional agriculture in the Chernobyl-Polesie State Radioecological Reserve and around the Fukushima accident, would both be implemented in the event of any widespread fallout contamination, with particular emphasis on bioremediation of radionuclides from soil and aquifers. Although less of a hazard than external exposure, internal decontamination, that may be required after assessment in a whole-body counting session, in the long term may, as is now, be conducted with binding-and-excretion promoting chelation therapy, with ammonium-ferric-hexacyano-ferrate (AFCF)/"Giese salt", Radiogardase and DPTA all proven effective.

Comparable binding/chelation treatment systems, developed and deployed due to the Fukushima reactor-water decontamination mandate, includes the mobile reverse osmosis Landysh water treatment ship, the zeolite-rock based "Actiflo", the "SARRY" ion exchange cesium removal system, based on silicotitanate "IONSIV" crystalline rock, and most recently the 62 multi-nuclide removal system (NURES), frequently referred to as the Advanced Liquid Processing System (ALPS). In 2016 tritiated water also began to be filtered.

Researchers at the American Chemical Society have further suggested that aquaponics would be an ideal socially-acceptable solution in the post-contamination environment, as it does not use soil to grow fish and vegetables, thus completely alleviating the radiophobia surrounding food that always follows long-lived contamination incidents. Others who have approached the food problem from a far more extreme view, assuming far worse events such as comet impacts (as discussed in the book Feeding Everyone No Matter What) have suggested: natural-gas-digesting bacteria, the most well known being methylococcus capsulatus, which is presently used as a feed in fish farming; bark bread, a long-standing famine food using the edible inner bark of trees (once a part of Scandinavian history during the Little Ice Age); and the expansion of leaf protein concentrate and larger scale wood digesting fungiculture for fungal protein, with the most common of which being shiitake mushrooms and honey fungi, as they do not need sunlight or soil to grow. More advanced techniques mentioned, which are not presently economical, also include variations of wood or cellulosic biofuel production (which typically already creates edible sugars/xylitol from inedible cellulose) as an intermediate product before the final step of alcohol generation.

== Historical and psychological assessment ==
Some historians and documentaries, including science historian Melissa Smith in a 2010 article for The British Journal for the History of Science and the film 1982 The Atomic Cafe, have described "duck and cover" advice as propaganda.

In U.S. Army training, soldiers are taught to immediately fall down, covering face and hands in much the same way as is described by the advice to duck and cover.

The exercises of Cold War civil defense were described by historian Guy Oakes in 1994 as having less practical use than psychological use: to keep the danger of nuclear war high on the public mind, while also attempting to assure the American people that something could be done to defend against nuclear attack.

== Tornadoes ==
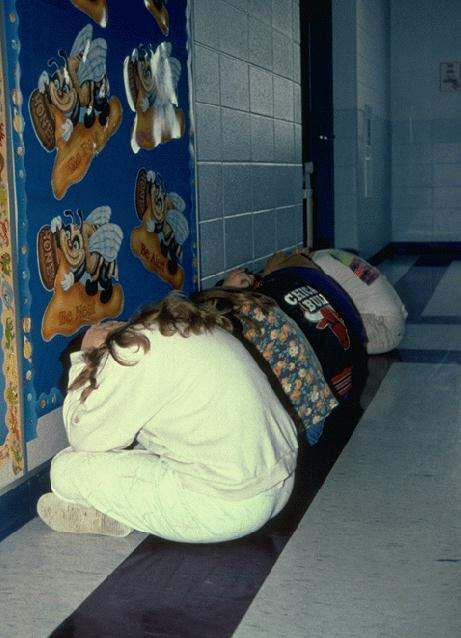
Students participate in a tornado drill, lining up along an interior wall and covering their heads. Tornado drills are an important element in tornado preparedness. Similar to other evidence based safety drills, they teach effective countermeasures and therefore increase survival rates if/when a tornado hits.

Ducking and covering does have certain applications in other, more natural disasters. In states prone to tornadoes, school children are urged to "duck and cover" against a solid inner wall of a school, if time does not permit seeking better shelter—such as a storm cellar—during a tornado warning. The tactic is also widely practiced in schools in states along the West Coast of the United States, where earthquakes are commonplace. Ducking and covering in either scenario would theoretically afford significant protection from falling or flying debris.

== Earthquakes ==
In an earthquake, which are generally of a natural tectonic plate origin (although they can be artificially generated by the detonation of a nuclear explosive device in which sufficient energy is transmitted into the ground, with an extreme case to serve as an example of this phenomenon being the Operation Grommet Cannikin test of the 5 megaton W71 warhead exploded deep underground on Amchitka Island in 1971, which produced a seismic shock quake of 7.0 on the Richter magnitude scale) people are encouraged, regardless of the cause of the quake, to "drop, cover and hold on": to get underneath a piece of furniture, cover their heads and hold on to the furniture. This advice also encourages people not to run out of a shaking building, because a large majority of earthquake injuries are due to broken bones from people falling and tripping during shaking. While it is unlikely that "drop, cover and hold on" will protect against a building collapse, in earthquake-prone areas in the United States building codes require that buildings withstand quakes up to an expected magnitude enough to allow evacuation after shaking stops. and thus a building collapse of these structures (even during an earthquake) is rare. "Drop, cover and hold on" may not be appropriate for all locations or building types, but the Red Cross advises it is the appropriate emergency response to an earthquake in the United States.

== See also ==
General

- A Day Called X a dramatized 1957 CBS documentary following the evacuation drill of the entire city of Portland, Oregon per Civil Defense protocol, in response to the RADAR detection of an en-route Soviet nuclear bomber force.
- Abo Elementary School - Underground school built in the 1960s, used until the 1990s
- Air-raid shelter
- Atomic Bomb Casualty Commission - upon whose work the writers of Duck and Cover heavily borrowed.
- Blast shelter
- Civil Defense Geiger counters
- Comparison of Chernobyl and other radioactivity releases
- CONELRAD
- Desert Rock exercises
- Enewetak Atoll
- High-altitude nuclear explosion
- List of artificial radiation belts
- List of nuclear weapons#Soviet Union/Russia
- Mass-casualty incident
- Mount Weather Emergency Operations Center
- National Response Scenario Number One
- Nevada Test Site
- Novaya Zemlya
- Nth Country Experiment
- Nuclear arms race
- Nuclear Emergency Support Team
- Nuclear terrorism
- Nuclear War Survival Skills
- Nuclear winter
- Operation Teapot
- Pacific Proving Grounds
- Pechora–Kama Canal
- Project SUNSHINE
- Radiobiology
- Radioecology
- Reactor-grade plutonium
- Semipalatinsk Test Site
- Stop, drop and roll - Advice for when one is on fire and no other means of extinguishing the flames are available.
- Subsidence crater
- The Geochemist's Workbench

Long-term survival

- Aeroponics agriculture with low water usage requirements
- Amateur radio emergency communications - post disaster networking
- Anaerobic waste digestion for fuel production
- Anti-flash white paint
- Appropriate technology
- Autonomous building homes
- Bioconversion of biomass to mixed alcohol fuels
- BIOS-3
- Chernobyl Exclusion Zone
- David J. Gingery DIY author of machine tool books
- Earthship homes
- Emergency preparedness
- Enriched CO2 greenhouse air agriculture
- Ex-Rad a medicinal product being tested for its effects at increasing human radioresistance
- Fallout Protection
- Hibakusha - survivors of prompt radiation with comparatively little to no fallout exposure
- Hurricane-proof building
- HurriQuake
- Preparedness
- Primitive skills
- Red Forest - heavily contaminated forest, with controlled biomass power burning suggested to prevent a re-suspension of fallout that would occur following a wildfire.
- Remanufacturing
- Removal of ions and dissolved substances from water
- Repurposing
- Seed bank
- Self-sustainability
- Whitewash paint
