= Ionized-air glow =

Optical phenomenon

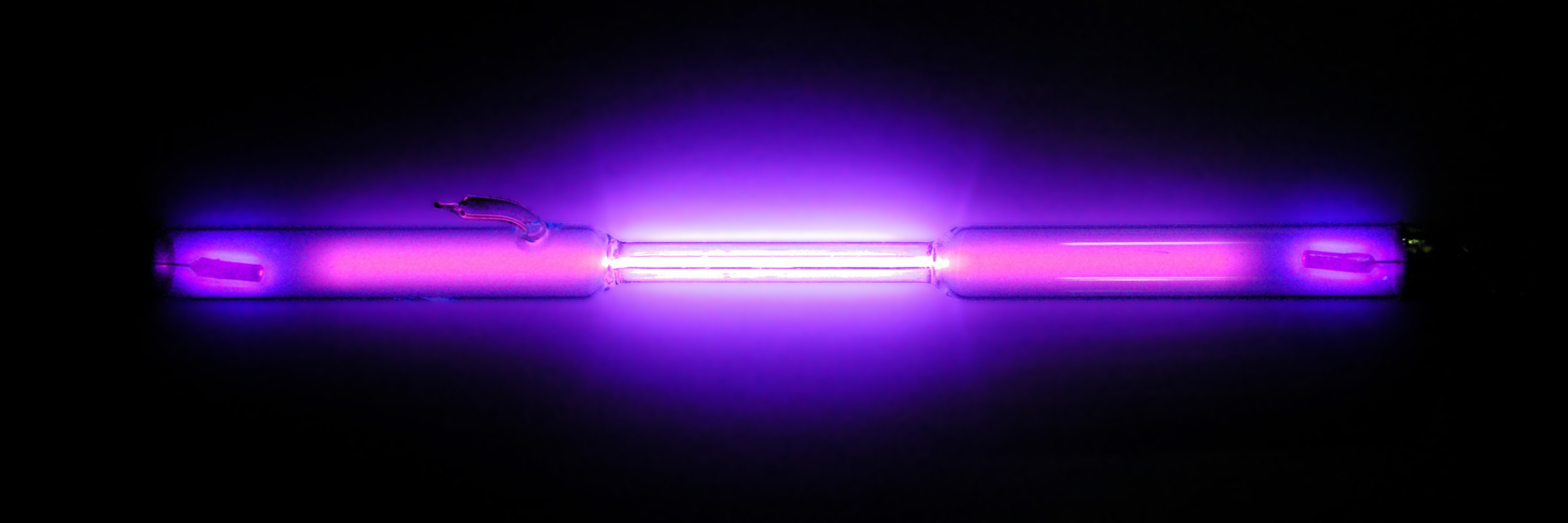
Nitrogen glow

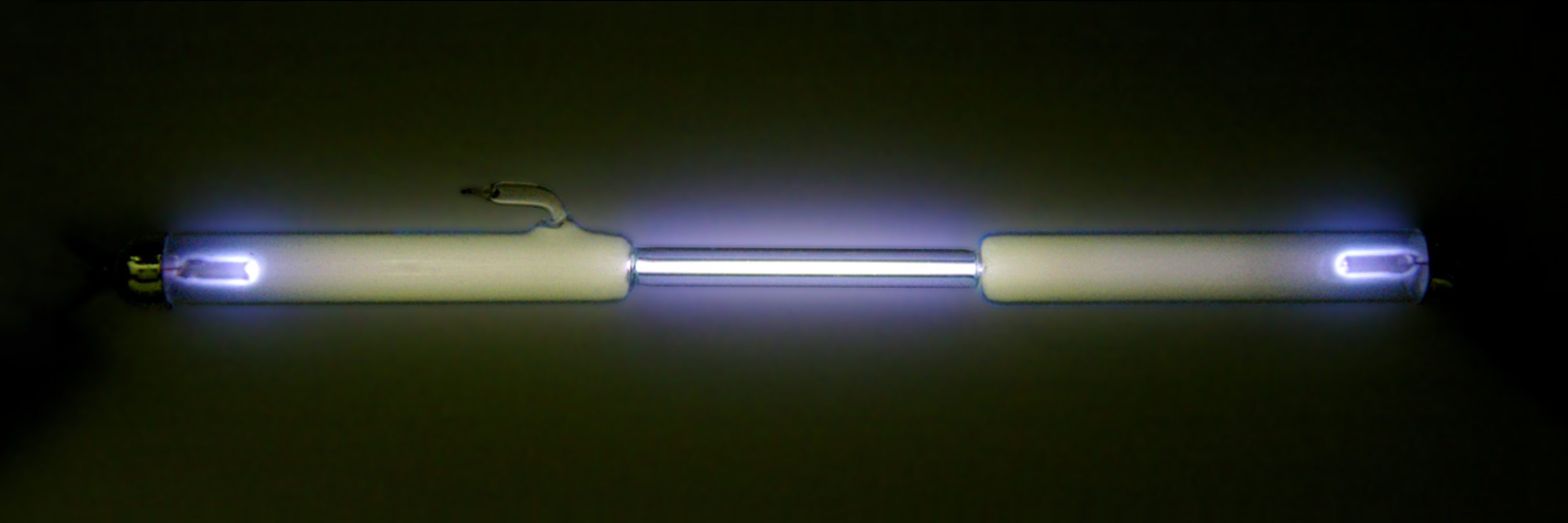
Oxygen glow

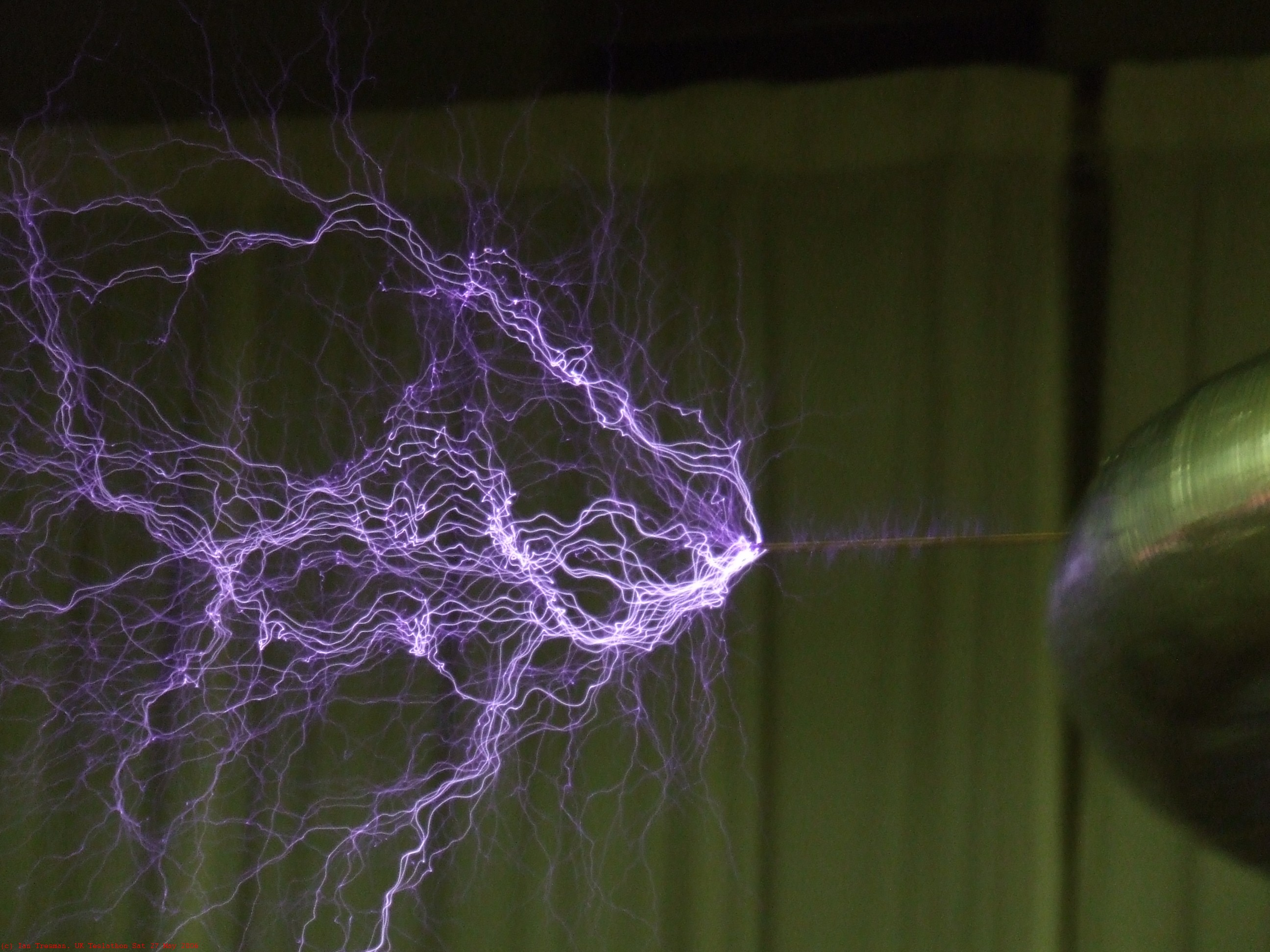
Electrical discharge in air

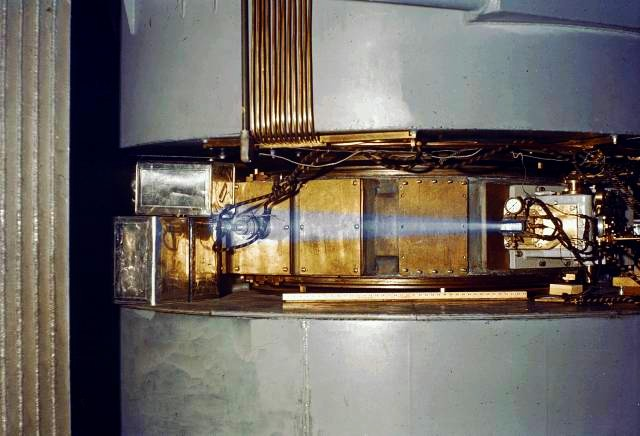
Particle beam from a cyclotron

Ionized-air glow is the luminescent emission of characteristic blue–purple–violet light, often of a color called electric blue, by air subjected to an energy flux either directly or indirectly from solar radiation.

== Processes ==
When energy is deposited in air, the air molecules become excited. As air is composed primarily of nitrogen and oxygen, excited N_{2} and O_{2} molecules are produced. These can react with other molecules, forming mainly ozone and nitrogen(II) oxide. Water vapor, when present, may also play a role; its presence is characterized by the hydrogen emission lines. The reactive species present in the plasma can readily react with other chemicals present in the air or on nearby surfaces.

=== Deexcitation of nitrogen ===
The excited nitrogen deexcites primarily by emission of a photon, with emission lines in ultraviolet, visible, and infrared band:

N_{2}^{*} → N_{2} + hν

The blue light observed is produced primarily by this process. The spectrum is dominated by lines of single-ionized nitrogen, with presence of neutral nitrogen lines.

=== Deexcitation of oxygen ===
The excited state of oxygen is somewhat more stable than nitrogen. While deexcitation can occur by emission of photons, the more probable mechanism at atmospheric pressure is a chemical reaction with other oxygen molecules, forming ozone:

O_{2}* + 2 O_{2} → 2 O_{3}

This reaction is responsible for the production of ozone in the vicinity of strongly radioactive materials and electrical discharges.

== Occurrence ==
Excitation energy can be deposited in air by a number of different mechanisms:

- Ionizing radiation is the cause of blue glow surrounding sufficient quantities of strongly radioactive materials in air, e.g. some radioisotope specimens (e.g. radium or polonium), particle beams (e.g. from particle accelerators) in air, the blue flashes during criticality accidents, and the eerie/low brightness "purple" to "blue" glow enveloping a mushroom cloud during the first several dozen seconds after nuclear explosions near sea level. This post-explosion effect has been observed only at night from atmospheric nuclear tests owing to its low brightness, with observers noticing it following the pre-dawn Trinity test, as well as Upshot-Knothole Annie, Operation Fishbowl, and the Cherokee shot of Operation Redwing.

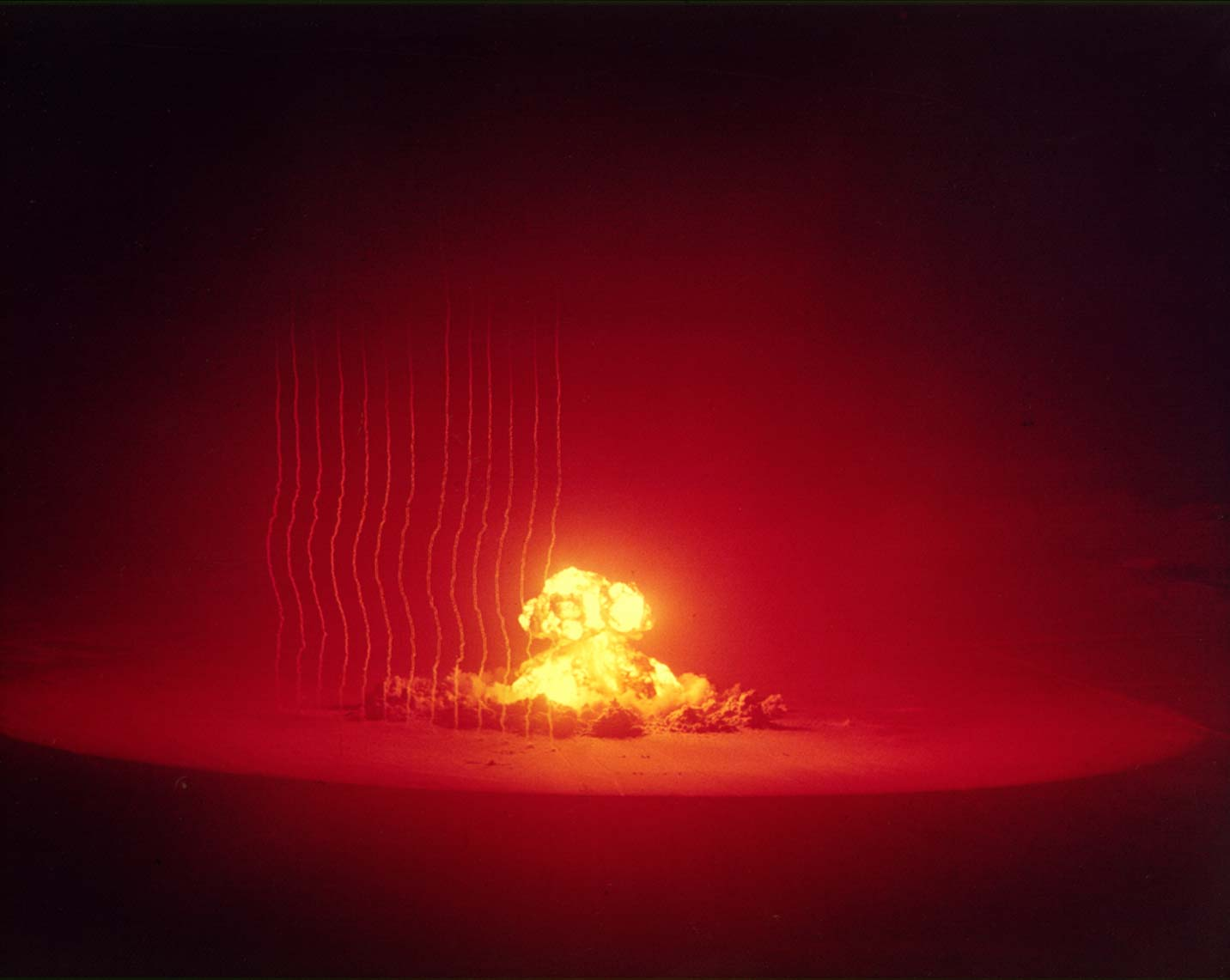
Upshot-Knothole Annie nuclear bomb test

- Within minutes after the steam explosion that caused the Chernobyl accident at 01:23 local time, employees at the power station went outside to get a clearer view of the extent of the damage. One such survivor, Alexander Yuvchenko, recounts that once he stopped outside and looked up towards the reactor hall he saw a "very beautiful" laser-like beam of light bluish light, caused by the ionization of air, that appeared to be "flooding up into infinity".
- Cathode rays in air produce this blue glow.
- Electrical discharge in air is the cause of blue light emitted by electric sparks, lightning, and corona discharges (e.g. St. Elmo's fire).
- Auroras, the sometimes observable blue-violet hues emitted by nitrogen at lower altitudes.

=== Colors ===
Emission spectrum of nitrogen

Emission spectrum of oxygen

Emission spectrum of hydrogen (water vapor is similar but dimmer)

In dry air, the color of produced light (e.g. by lightning) is dominated by the emission lines of nitrogen, yielding the spectrum with primarily blue emission lines. The lines of neutral nitrogen (NI), neutral oxygen (OI), singly ionized nitrogen (NII) and singly ionized oxygen (OII) are the most prominent features of a lightning emission spectrum. Neutral nitrogen radiates primarily at one line in the red part of the spectrum. Ionized nitrogen radiates primarily as a set of lines in the blue part of the spectrum.

A violet hue can occur when the spectrum contains emission lines of atomic hydrogen. This may happen when the air contains high amount of water, e.g. with lightnings in low altitudes passing through rain thunderstorms. Water vapor and small water droplets ionize and dissociate easier than large droplets, therefore have higher impact on color.

The hydrogen emission lines at 656.3 nm (the strong H-alpha line) and at 486.1 nm (H-beta) are characteristic for lightnings. Rydberg atoms, generated by low-frequency lightnings, emit at red to orange color and can give the lightning a yellowish to greenish tint.^{(confusing?)} Generally, the radiant species present in atmospheric plasma are N_{2}, N_{2}^{+}, O_{2}, NO (in dry air) and OH (in humid air). The temperature, electron density, and electron temperature of the plasma can be inferred from the distribution of rotational lines of these species. At higher temperatures, atomic emission lines of N and O, and (in presence of water) H, are present. Other molecular lines, e.g. CO and CN, mark the presence of contaminants in the air.

=== Cherenkov radiation ===
The emission of blue light is often attributed to Cherenkov radiation. Cherenkov radiation is produced by charged particles which are traveling through a dielectric substance at a speed greater than the speed of light in that medium. Despite the production of similarity-colored light and an association with high-energy particles, Cherenkov radiation is generated by a fundamentally different mechanism.

== See also ==
- Airglow
