= Jean Trounstine =

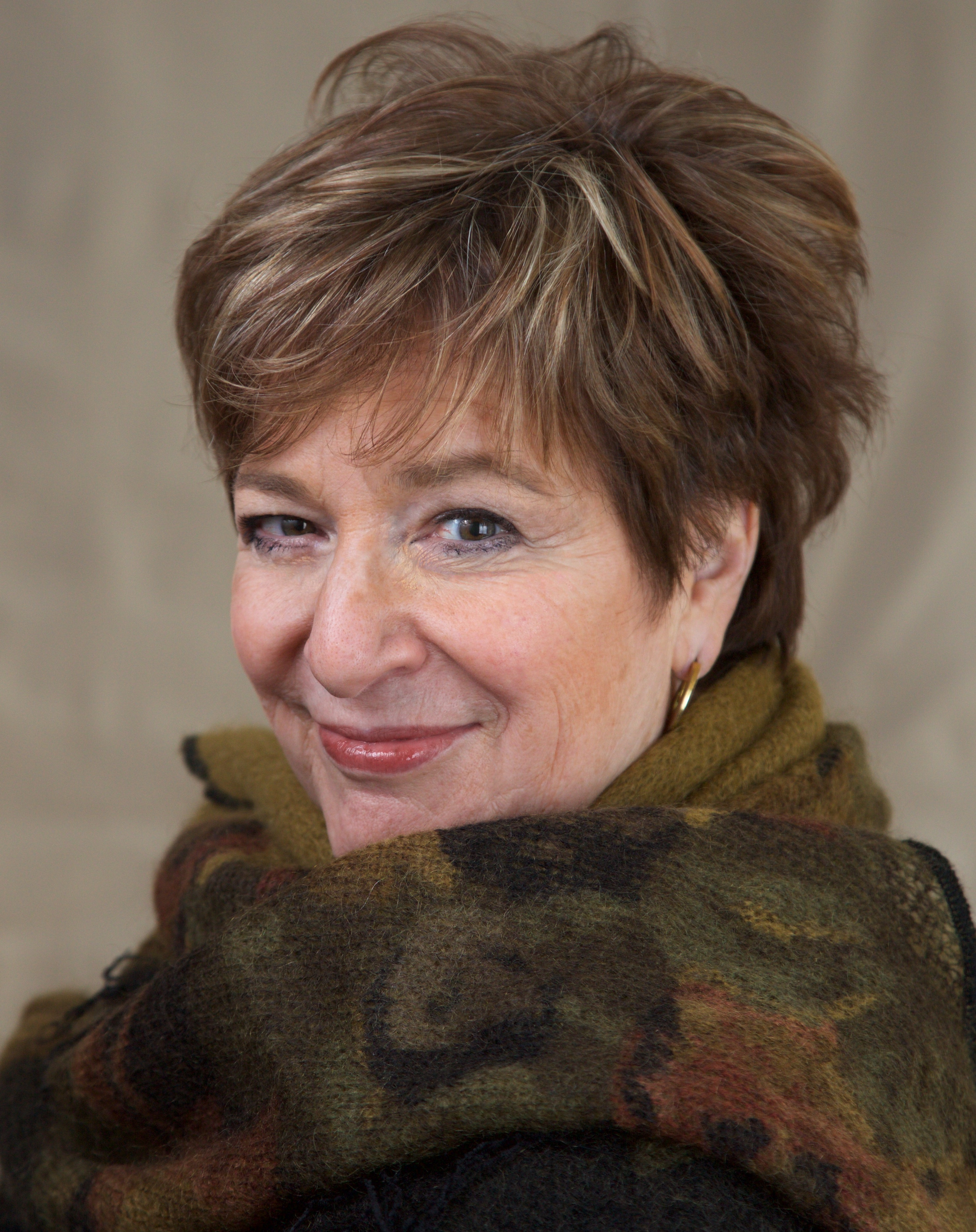
- Jean Trounstine, February 12, 2016
- Born: December 11, 1946 (age 79); Cincinnati, Ohio
- Education: M.F.A. Brandeis University; B.A. Beloit College
- Alma mater: Brandies University
- Occupations: Activist, Author, Teacher
- Spouse: Robert Wald
- Website: www.jeantrounstine.com

Jean Trounstine is an activist, author and professor emerita at Middlesex Community College in Lowell, Massachusetts, USA.

== Early life and education ==
Jean Trounstine, the daughter of Henry Philip and Amy Joseph Trounstine, grew up in Cincinnati, Ohio. She attended Walnut Hills High School (Cincinnati, Ohio), a public college-preparatory high school. She graduated with a B.A. in theater with honors from Beloit College in 1965, and an M.F.A. in acting from Brandeis University in 1973. She began her career as an actress, pursued films and theater in California and has performed in 30 plays.

== Teaching and activism ==
Trounstine taught high school English in Duxbury, Massachusetts, (1986–8) and at Nashoba Regional High School (1988–9) before joining the faculty at Middlesex Community College (Massachusetts) in 1989. In 1987, she began teaching and piloted work with women, directing plays at the Massachusetts Correctional Institution at Framingham for almost ten years. She co-founded the women's branch of Changing Lives Through Literature (CLTL) in 1992 with Judge Joseph Dever, First Justice of the Lynn District Court. Probationers, probation officers, judges and professors sit in a classroom together and discuss books. CLTL costs less than $500 a person and proponents say that it saves the government tens of thousands of dollars when compared with the cost of housing a prisoner. A recidivism study of the program by Russell Schutt, a University of Massachusetts professor, showed that it helps to reduce a return to crime. In 2008, after Trounstine met Karter Reed, who was incarcerated in an adult prison for murder that he committed at age 16, she began researching juvenile justice.

== Publishing history ==
Date(s)	Role	Title
1999	Co-editor (with Robert Waxler)	Changing Lives Through Literature
2001, 2004	Author	Shakespeare Behind Bars: The Power of Drama in a Women's Prison
2003	Author	Almost Home Free, poetry collection about cancer
2005	Co-authored (with Robert Waxler)	Finding A Voice: The Practice of Changing Lives Through Literature,
2006, 2007	Co-editor (with Karen Propp)	Why I'm Still Married: Women Write Their Hearts Out On Love, Loss, Sex, and Who Does the Dishes
2016	Author	Boy With A Knife: The Story of Murder, Remorse, and A Prisoner's Fight for Justice
2024	Author	MotherLove, short story collection

== Other writing ==
Her writing on prison issues has been published in Working Woman magazine, The Southwest Review, The Boston Globe Magazine, Huffington Post and many other publications in the US. They include:

- "The Memory We Call Home", The Best Women's Travel Writing 2008, Travelers' Tales
- "Revisiting Sacred Spaces", Performing New Lives: Prison Theatre, 2011
- "Three Strikes and You're Out", Metrowest Daily News, January 1, 2012
- "A Gift from Prison", Solstice, fall/winter 2012
- "Locked Up With Nowhere to Go", Boston, July 2013
- "Rose", in Essays on Teaching", 2013
- "Keep Kids Out of Handcuffs", Truthout, May 2015
- "Changing Women's Lives Through Literature", Women's Review of Books, May–June 2015
- "A Year of Disaster At Old Colony: Suicide Attempts, Self-Harm, and COVID", DIGBos, May 2021

== Prizes and awards ==
Trounstine has won many awards for her work. She won a grant from the National Endowment for the Humanities in 1987 to study Shakespeare in England. She won grants from the Massachusetts Foundation for Humanities in 1988, 1989 and 1990 to create theater for women in prison. She was a recipient for "Women who Care" presented by Women in Philanthropy in 1993. In 2000, she was named a "Woman who Dared" by the Jewish Women's Archive for her work in prison. In 2001, she received an honorable mention for the Ernest Lynton Award for outstanding college teachers nationally who excel in outreach to the community Her piece, "Meeting Karter", won an honorable mention for non-fiction in Solstice magazine's 2010 Summer issue. In 2018, the Gramsci Prize was presented to her in Italy for her work in literature and prison, recognizing the rights of women held in prisons throughout the world.

== See also ==
- Changing Lives Through Literature
- Applied Drama
- Incarceration in the United States
