= Changing Lives Through Literature =

American bibliotherapy program

Changing Lives Through Literature (CLTL) is a bibliotherapy program that offers alternative probation sentences to offenders. The program was created in 1991 by Robert Waxler, an English professor at the University of Massachusetts Dartmouth, and Superior Court Judge Robert Kane. At a cost of less than $500 a person, proponents say that CLTL saves the government tens of thousands of dollars when compared with the cost of housing an inmate for a lifetime at an annual rate of $30,000. The program is said to help reduce the recidivism rate among certain segments of the prison population. Former offenders credit the program for giving them a second chance.

Several studies of the CLTL program have been published. A longitudinal study by Jarjoura & Krumholz (1998) found favorable results, with lower rates of recidivism than those in a comparison, non-program group. Liberal and conservative penal systems throughout the U.S., including Arizona, California, Connecticut, Florida, Illinois, Indiana, Kansas, Maine, Massachusetts, New York, Rhode Island, Texas, and Virginia, have embraced the program. CLTL was brought to Manchester, England as part of the "Stories Connect" program run by the Writers in Prison Network.

The program has received a New England Board of Higher Education award for excellence and an Exemplary Education Grant from the National Endowment for the Humanities.

== History ==
In the 1980s, English professor Robert Waxler attended a summer seminar about literature and society at Princeton University. They discussed the purpose of literature in a technological society. What role would literature play in the future? Waxler felt strongly that "literature was the most important tool we had to humanize ourselves and society". A decade later, Waxler began to develop this concept into an experimental hypothesis. He contacted his friend and tennis partner, Judge Robert Kane, and proposed an idea: instead of sending criminals to jail who might otherwise go through the revolving door of criminal justice—sentence them to a discussion group run by Waxler at the University of Massachusetts, Dartmouth. "It was...a chance to demonstrate that literature did have the power to change lives", recalls Waxler.

The Changing Lives Through Literature (CLTL) program first began in the fall of 1991 at the University of Massachusetts Dartmouth, with Robert Waxler, Judge Robert Kane, and probation officer Wayne St. Pierre. Initial applicants were male probationers from New Bedford who were offered the opportunity to participate in the program. If they successfully completed the program, six months would be reduced from their probation. In 1992, Jean Trounstine cofounded the first CLTL program for women. The success of CLTL has led to its adoption in at least 12 other states. The program is also taught in Manchester, England.

== Requirements ==
Potential participants, including juveniles and adults, must demonstrate basic literacy, equivalent to the reading level of eighth grade, and the desire to improve their lives. In some difficult cases, the literacy requirement might be loosened to allow for motivated individuals. Although the majority of probationers have had to deal with substance abuse issues in the past, those currently dealing with substance abuse issues or convicted of sex offenses are not allowed to participate in the program.

The CLTL program is considered challenging and is taken seriously by the class and its teachers. Students who are absent from class or fail to complete their homework can be sent back to jail. High attrition rates can occur in some cases.

== Programs ==
"At the heart of the Changing Lives philosophy is the notion that literature, one of the great common denominators of the human experience, has the power to affect our thoughts and behavior...we can recognize ourselves and others in the characters of great books, and in so doing gain much-needed understanding about who we are and who we want to be—in our most private thoughts and in the relationships and actions that link us to others."

In 2000, British writer Mary Stephenson modeled her "Stories Connect" group in UK prisons after CLTL.

The CLTL program received the New England Board of Higher Education award for excellence in 2004. The National Endowment for the Humanities awarded the program a grant in 2003 which enabled them to create a website.

The "Read To Succeed" program for juvenile offenders, a cooperation between the Johnson County Library, district court, school district, and department of corrections in Johnson County, Kansas, was based on the CLTL program. The library received the 2005 National Award for Museum and Library Service for its work. U.S. Senator Sam Brownback said "the library merits commendation for its Changing Lives Through Literature program, which has dramatically reduced the recidivism rate among probationary teens."

In 2007, Fairfax County, Virginia, implemented the CLTL program. For their work, the received an Outstanding Achievement in Local Government Innovation Award and a National Association of Counties (NACo) Achievement Award in 2008.

By 2015, a Massachusetts Trial Court Grant funded program for the Girls Group, an alternative dispute resolution program which incorporated CLTL. Advocate and grant writer Shea Kiley, secured additional funding in 2016, for the continued expansion of the Girls Group allowing continued support of the CLTL model. Girls Group operates at the New Bedford Juvenile Court with leadership from probation officer Estella Rebeiro and court clinician Ann Condon. Additional guidance is coordinated with oversight by New Bedford Chief of Police – Joseph C. Cordeiro, who continues the "CITY OF ONE" mission in this community collaboration.

== Books ==
Sample texts used in the CLTL program include books tailored for segregated men and women's classes. Gender segregation was the preferred teaching environment chosen by participants, including both offenders and professors.

Men's program

- Animal Farm
- Deliverance
- Greasy Lake
- Of Mice and Men
- The Old Man and the Sea
- The Sea-Wolf
- Sonny's Blues
- Greasy Lake
- A Chance in the World

Women's program

- Bastard Out of Carolina
- The Bean Trees
- The Bluest Eye
- Dinner at the Homesick Restaurant
- The House on Mango Street
- Their Eyes Were Watching God
- To Kill a Mockingbird
- Night
- Where Are You Going, Where Have You Been?

== Results ==
Studies suggest that offenders who participate in the CLTL program are less likely to reoffend.

In 1998, criminologist G. Roger Jarjoura at Indiana University and law and society scholar Susan T. Krumholz of the University of Massachusetts Dartmouth published a longitudinal study focusing on the first CLTL program in New Bedford, Massachusetts from 1993. They tested two groups, one in CLTL and another in a competing program group. In the CLTL group, 18% committed crimes compared to 42% in the non-CLTL group.

== See also ==
- Criminal sentencing in the United States
- Law and literature
- Neurophilosophy
- Read to Succeed
- Writing for Our Lives
- Jean Trounstine
