= Greasy Lake (film) =

- Directed by: Damian Harris
- Written by: Damian Harris
- Based on: "Greasy Lake" by T. Coraghessan Boyle
- Produced by: Margaret Goldsmith; David Bartlett; Damian Harris; Philip S. Miller; Jim Steele
- Starring: Eric Stoltz; James Spader
- Narrated by: Tom Waits
- Cinematography: Miles Cook
- Edited by: David Bartlett
- Music by: Ron Bartlett; Oscar Mitt
- Production company: Chanticleer Films
- Distributed by: PBS (TV); JCI Video
- Release date: 1988 (USA)
- Running time: 30 minutes
- Country: United States
- Language: English

Greasy Lake is a 1988 American short drama film based on the short story "Greasy Lake" by T. Coraghessan Boyle. It was directed by Damian Harris and stars Eric Stoltz and James Spader.

== Plot ==
At the start of summer vacation, three 19-year-old friends set out cruising on a trip toward Greasy Lake outside Los Angeles that ends up being more eventful than they expected.

== Cast ==
- Eric Stoltz as T.C.
- James Spader as Digby
- Tegan West as Jeff
- Cisco Pike as Bad Ass
- Dirty Dick as Biker
- Freaky Frank as Biker
- Jeff Edwards as Hitch Hiker
- Julie Dolan as Bad Ass' Girlfriend
- Annabel Harris as Bad Girl #1
- Denise Crosby as Bad Girl #2
- Tom Waits as Narrator

== Release ==
The film was shown at the American Film Institute Festival in 1988 and was later released with three other short films on the 1990 videocassette The Discovery Program, volume 1, distributed by JCI Video.
