= Greasy Lake & Other Stories =

Book by T. Coraghessan Boyle

- First edition
- Author: T. Coraghessan Boyle
- Language: English
- Publisher: Viking Press
- Publication date: 1985
- Publication place: United States
- Media type: Print (hardback)
- Pages: 229 pp
- ISBN: 0-14-007781-2
- OCLC: 12803856
- Dewey Decimal: 813/.54 19
- LC Class: PS3552.O932 G7 1986

Greasy Lake is a collection of short stories by T. Coraghessan Boyle published in 1985 by Viking Press.

== Author Background ==
The collection reflects the fears, anxieties and issues of America in the 1960s, especially in regard to the fear of a nuclear holocaust. "One of the astonishing things about looking back at old stories are their references to then-current political and social events", he said in the forums on his personal website. "We write in a given period, and that period seems to vanish rather quickly, so that all stories become historical the moment they're finished." In another interview he stated that he never starts writing with a particular theme in mind—that an author’s obsessions at the time emerge naturally to form unity within a short story or a collection of stories. When he spoke with the San Francisco Chronicle, he revealed the reason behind his focus on the anxieties of American society at large. "I worry about everything in the world," Boyle says, "and it's just too much for anybody to think about, so I have my art as my consolation." In the same interview he stated that it’s the stable things in his life—his wife, children, same teaching post for thirty years, the same agent—that enable him to focus on his art. The title story of this collection was inspired by Bruce Springsteen’s song "Spirit in the Night". Boyle himself is a musician and once aspired to play rock music. For a short while he played saxophone in a band called The Ventilators, although they never recorded. Greasy Lake is also reminiscent of Boyle’s years as a "rebellious punk". The often flamboyant outcomes of his stories are a result of his personal theory about writing—that like music, it is ultimately a form of entertainment. He believes that reading has declined in America because stories have become a high art that is incomprehensible to the average person. To him, a story has failed when it requires a critic to mediate between the reader and author. Rather, a story should be approached as something done for leisure or pleasure—not as a school chore. In an interview with the San Francisco Chronicle, Boyle states, "My ambition is to make great art that is appealing to anyone who knows how to read."

== Greasy Lake ==
The "Greasy Lake" characters, Digby, whose parents paid his tuition to Cornell; Jeff, who had a dangerous personality; and the "wanna-be bad" narrator relish their "bad boy" image. T. C. Boyle describes their "Bad Boy" behavior: “we wore torn-up leather jackets, slouched around with toothpicks in our mouths, sniffed glue and ether [...]." The lake, much like the character's foolish desires, has turned into a lagoon of refuse with broken bottles lining its banks. T.C. Boyle’s reference to war is as vivid as the lake, “so stripped of vegetation it looked as if the Air Force had strafed it.” The mention of General Westmoreland's tactical errors in Khe Sahn equates to the main character's disastrous misguided offense of losing his car keys. A moral dilemma occurs but is not directly exposed, since the characters desire a "bad boy" image, T.C. Boyle writes: "There was a time when courtesy and winning ways went out of style, when it was good to be bad". However, an epiphany is reached when the "bad boys" realize that what they desire is not always a good thing.

== Caviar ==
"Caviar" is a story about a married couple involved in a "little experiment." It is narrated by the husband, Mr. Trimpdie, a fisherman by trade, who has never been to college but reads science books and magazines. The wife, Marie, after many years of marriage decides she wants some "offspring." The pair repeatedly try to have a child, but Marie cannot get pregnant. The couple go to a doctor and ask about a test-tube baby. Dr. Ziss, a very young man, tells them that Marie’s ovaries are shot, and that test-tube reproduction is impossible. Dr. Ziss asks, "have they considered a surrogate mother?" He has already contacted a woman on their behalf, should they be interested. For ten thousand dollars plus hospital costs, they agree to have Wendy, a medical school student, as their surrogate mother. Wendy is artificially impregnated by the doctor and becomes very close to the couple. One day, while Marie is working, Wendy and Mr. Trimpie engage in a sexual relationship. Marie never finds out about the incident. Mr. Trimpie, while visiting Wendy after the baby is born, finds Dr. Ziss at her house and realizes he has been deceived. Wendy says she won’t stay with him because they move in different circles. Enraged, Mr. Trimpie assaults Dr. Ziss, and is arrested by the police. Back to his house, Marie won’t let him in, and he ends up at the dock gutting a fish full of "eggs in her."

== Ike and Nina ==
The short story of "Ike and Nina" is a reference to the thirty-fourth President of the United States, Dwight D. Eisenhower (Ike) who has a sentimentally romantic, yet (hypothetical) love affair with Russia's Madame Nina Khrushcheva. The narrator of the fictional short story was promoted to "special aid" during the time of a "visit by the Soviet Premier and his uh wife," and makes this a plausible tale, as he supposedly confesses the true account of the love story. T. C. Boyle's allusions to the Cold War era are numerous. "Top Secret" and "Strictly Confidential" personal incidents, like those of a hide-n-seek limousine ride, and a stately dinner party, result in legions of Secret Service agents, the CIA and the FBI, kept virtually off balance and unaware of Ike and Nina's situation.

== On for the Long Haul ==
"On for the Long Haul" substantiates the hysteria of the 'duck and cover' generation. The characters are put into a bizarre situation that borders on historical realism. The characters, Bayard Wemp, a successful business man who was used to luxury living, his highstrung neurotic wife, Fran, and their two adolescent children Melissa and Marcia, together are determined to survive an overpowering feeling of apocalyptic fever. Mr. Wemp enters into a nefarious real estate deal to purchase thirty-five acres of land in the secluded area of Bounceback, Montana. T.C. Boyle's references to "bomb shelters under patios," "world wide economic callapse," Kaddafi with "The Bomb" and the "temporarily out of food" signs suggesting possible rationing further imitate Bayards imaginary need to be prepared. T. C. Boyle writes, "Civilization itself--was on the brink of a catastrophe that would make the Dark Ages look like a Sunday-afternoon softball game." The situation the main character hopes will eventually work itself out ironically ends with his demise.

== The Hector Quesadilla Story ==
In "The Hector Quesadilla Story" the main character was "no Joltin' Joe, no Sultan of Swat, no Iron Man." Hector Hernan Jesus y Maria Quesadilla, a.k.a. "Little Cheese" is an aging baseball player stuck in a time warp. While confident about his participation in the dream of the "Big Game," Hector refuses to acknowledge his age. In this short story, Hector's family suggests that it is time to "Hang up his Spikes," after all his "son will be twenty-nine next month and his daughter has four children of her own with one on the way," but for Hector, a missed moment is continuously replayed as "the stick flashes in your hands like an Archangel's sword, and the game goes on forever."

== The Overcoat II ==
This is the final story of the collection. T.C. Boyle rewrites the classic Nikolai Gogol story, but transports his characters into the Cold War era. The main character, Akaky Akakievich Bashmachkin, a "hard-nosed revolutionary communist worker," hopes to purchase a new "Good Quality Soviet Made Winter Coat." Akaky purchases a winter coat from his tailor Petrovich at a cost of Five-hundred and fifty Rubles, however, unbeknownst to Akaky the coat was a "Black Market" purchase. The fine cloth coat with "a fur collar, like those in Paris," elevates Akaky in his workplace as everyone notices, the "party tool and office drudge" is now strutting like a "coryphee with the Bolshi." Like Gogol's story, Akaky is given a taste of respect and happiness symbolized by the coat only to have it ripped away to tragic effect. In keeping with surreal situations, Akaky finds himself embroiled in police matters while the recipient of smuggled goods.

== Critical reception ==
Greasy Lake and Other Stories was first published in 1985.

The main characters in the stories are, according to Larry McCaffery, "typically lusty, exuberant dreamers whose wildly inflated ambitions lead them into a series of hilarious, often disastrous adventures." Though most stories are set in twentieth century America, some are set in other parts of the world. "Beggar of Sivani-Hoota" is set in India in "the remote Decan state of Sivani-Hoota," and satirizes with Orientalist motifs. "The Overcoat II", a reworking of Gogol’s classic short story, is set in the Soviet Union before the fall of communism.

In stories set in America, life is depicted as "a roller coaster ride, filled with peaks of exhilaration and excitement but also fraught with hidden dangers and potential embarrassments." The story "Greasy Lake", whose title and epigraph are borrowed from Bruce Springsteen, tells the story of a group of wannabe “bad” kids who come to the lake hoping to "smoke pot, howl at the stars, and savor the incongruous full-throated roar of rock and roll" but find themselves facing a vicious thug who drives the main character into the murky lake where he has a "grizzly encounter with the corpse of dead biker and is forced to endure the whomp-whomp sounds of his family’s station wagon being demolished." In "The New Moon Party", a presidential candidate promises to replace the old moon with a glittering new moon. He is successful in capturing the imagination of the country, restoring the average working man’s faith and progress, giving America a cause to stand up and shout about but only to see his new moon "blamed for everything from causing rain in the Atacama to fomenting a new baby boom, corrupting morals, bestializing mankind, and finally to see the moon obliterated by a nuclear thunderbolt a month after the new president takes office."

In "The New Moon Party" the narrator describes his dull aides as “a bunch of young Turks and electoral strong-arm men who wielded briefcase like swords and had political ambitions akin to Genghis Khan’s.”.

According to The New York Times reviewer Michiko Kakutani, T.C. Boyle has "a limitless capacity for invention and a gift for nimble, hyperventilated prose to delineate his heightened vision of the world." Kakutani continues, “Though the tales share the author’s distinctly manic voice, a voice pitched just this side of hysteria, they remain remarkably eclectic in form, disparate in subject matter – a testament to both Mr. Boyle’s range as a storyteller and to the reach of his ambition.”

== Media adaptations ==
- "Greasy Lake", the first story in the collection, was made into a short film in 1988. Directed by Damian Harris, the drama stars James Spader as Digby and Eric Stoltz as T.C.
