= Robert Waxler =

Robert Waxler is an English professor at the University of Massachusetts Dartmouth. Waxler co-founded the Changing Lives Through Literature (CLTL) program in 1991, and is the co-founder of the Umass Dartmouth Center for Jewish Culture.

== Achievements ==
Putting into action his belief that "literature is the greatest tool we have in our culture to humanize society," Waxler co-founded Changing Lives Through Literature (CLTL) in 1991. CLTL is an innovative sentencing program for criminal offenders that centers around a series of literature seminars facilitated by a professor. The program was recently awarded a $180,000 grant from the National Endowment for the Humanities to make it universally accessible through a website and CD-ROM.

Waxler was also co-founder and co-director (for 15 years) of the UMass Dartmouth Center for Jewish Culture. He has also served as Dean of the Division of Continuing Education, Associate Dean of the College of Arts and Sciences, and chairperson of the English Department.

Waxler's PhD dissertation was on William Blake. He has published articles on such writers as Blake, Ken Kesey, and Philip Roth, as well as articles on subjects ranging from Jewish culture to communications in the business environment. He has co-authored Success Stories, a pamphlet published by the U. S. Department of Education. He has co-edited Changing Lives Through Literature, an anthology from Notre Dame Press (1999). He has co-authored a book with his wife, Linda, which was published in September, 2003, by Spinner Publications. Losing Jonathan centers on the 1995 death of the Waxler's son, Jonathan, after a battle with heroin. The book describes the last year of Jonathan's life and the years after his death, tracing the curve of his parents' grief. Most recently, he co-authored Finding a Voice, a book published by University of Michigan Press (2006).
