= National Response Scenario Number One =

US government protocol against a nuclear attack

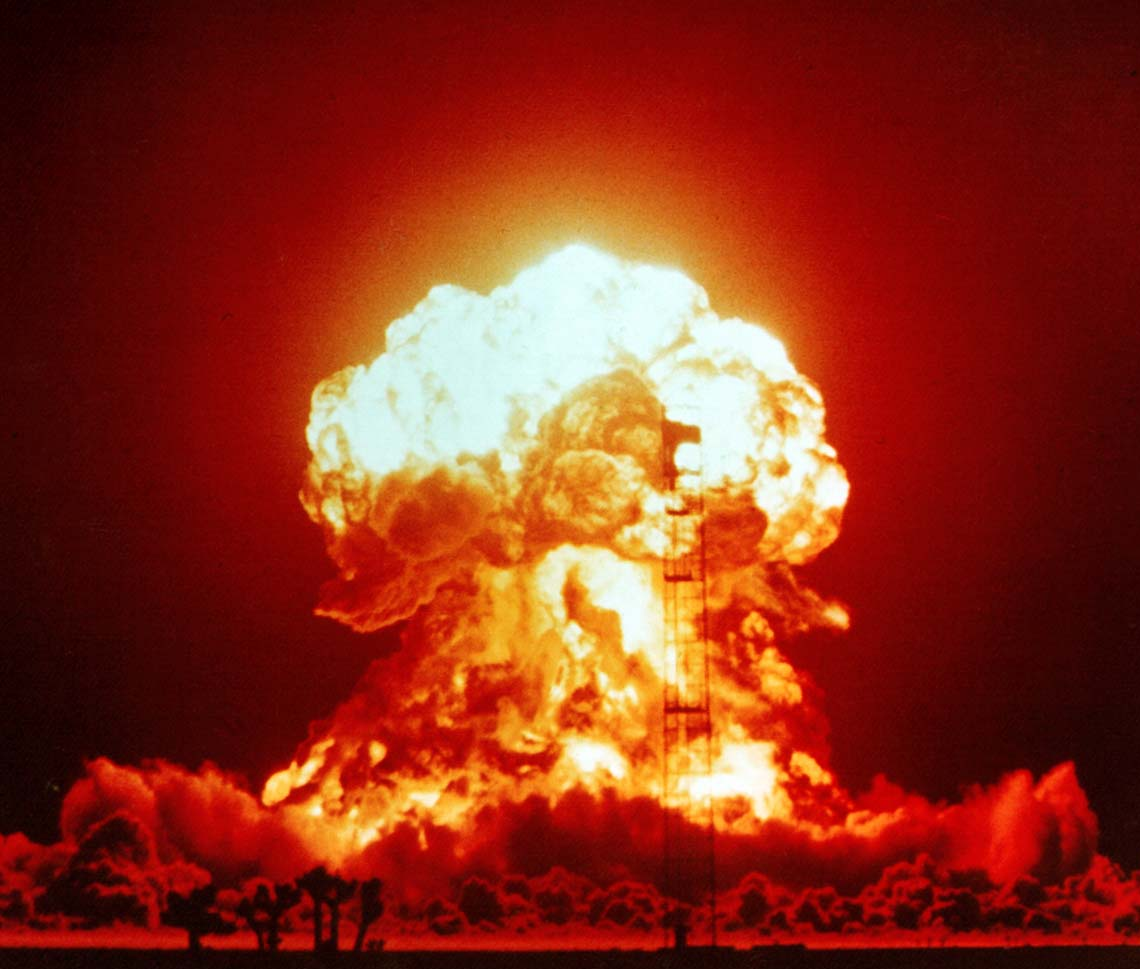
Nuclear weapons testing.

National Response Scenario Number One is the United States federal government's planned response to a small scale nuclear attack. It is one of the National Response Scenarios developed by the United States Department of Homeland Security, considered the most likely of fifteen emergency scenarios to impact the United States. The Scenarios are related to the National Response Framework (NRF), which describes the structures and mechanisms of a response and the National Incident Management System (NIMS) that gives a framework to orchestrate emergency management. The scenario anticipates terrorists detonating a single, 10 kiloton weapon (about two-thirds the size of the Hiroshima bomb) in a major city, as opposed to a full-scale nuclear war, in which a foreign power such as Russia or China would detonate hundreds or thousands of weapons.

The guidelines and the implementation framework were developed after the September 11 attacks and the Hurricane Katrina disaster.

== The nuclear threat ==
Nuclear weapons materials on the black market are a global concern, and there is concern about the possible detonation of a small, crude nuclear weapon by a terrorist group in a major city, with significant loss of life and property.

President Barack Obama has reviewed Homeland Security policy and concluded that "attacks using improvised nuclear devices [...] pose a serious and increasing national security risk." In their presidential contest, President George W. Bush and Senator John Kerry both agreed that the most serious danger facing the United States is the possibility that terrorists could obtain a nuclear bomb. Most nuclear-weapon analysts agree that "building such a device would pose few technological challenges to reasonably competent terrorists.” The main barrier is acquiring highly enriched uranium.

Despite a number of claims, there is no credible evidence that any terrorist group has yet succeeded in obtaining a nuclear bomb or the materials needed to make one. In 2004, Graham Allison, U.S. Assistant Secretary of Defense during the Clinton administration, wrote that "on the current path, a nuclear terrorist attack on America in the decade ahead is more likely than not." Also in 2004, Bruce Blair, president of the Center for Defense Information stated: "I wouldn't be at all surprised if nuclear weapons are used over the next 15 or 20 years, first and foremost by a terrorist group that gets its hands on a Russian nuclear weapon or a Pakistani nuclear weapon." In 2006, Robert Gallucci of the Georgetown University School of Foreign Service estimated that "it is more likely than not that al-Qaeda or one of its affiliates will detonate a nuclear weapon in a U.S. city within the next five to ten years."

== The scenario ==
The response timeline will begin the instant the detonation occurs. In this scenario, a terrorist cell creates a nuclear device using highly enriched uranium (HEU) using nuclear device components that are smuggled into the United States. The 10-kiloton nuclear device would most likely be assembled near a large U.S. city. The cities that would most likely be attacked are Washington, New York City and Los Angeles. Using a van or SUV, the device could easily be delivered to the heart of a city and detonated. The effects and response planning from a nuclear blast are determined using statics from Washington, the most likely target. An estimated 5,000 casualties would be killed within .25 of a second after detonation and within 15 seconds an estimated 30,000 casualties would result from the detonation. Estimated casualties could reach 100,000 after 24 hours. Buildings within three miles are severely damaged. The contaminated area would be roughly 3,000 square miles depending on environmental factors such as weather and terrain. An electromagnetic pulse (EMP) damages much of electronic devices, power grids and communication systems in the surrounding area.

== Effects ==
The detonation will cause many secondary hazards. The intense heat of a nuclear explosion would produce fires throughout the immediate blast zone. Damaged buildings, downed power and phone lines, broken gas lines and water mains, and weakened bridges and tunnels are hazardous conditions that will need to be assessed depending on the type of industries present. For example, chemical or petroleum production, industrial storage facilities, and manufacturing operations could cause significant releases of hazardous materials. Environmental considerations such as nearby bodies of water, prevailing winds and the general type of terrain have to be considered for an emergency response and evacuation. An explosion in a large city would result in an estimated 450,000 to 700,000 displaced persons flooding into nearby states. The country's economic impact would be hundreds of billions of dollars with the estimated time of recovery being decades. Furthermore, the electronic magnetic pulse (EMP), a high-voltage spike that radiates out from the detonation site, can disrupt the communication networks and electronic equipment within a 3-mile range from a 10-kiloton ground blast. The electrical power grid is likely to be damaged by the destruction of substations, power production facilities and distribution installations. The grid damage may cause power outages over wide areas and over several states. These outages should be repaired within several days or weeks. Communication systems would suffer similar damage and will likely be repaired within similar time frames. There will likely be significant damage to general public support infrastructures. These systems include transportation such as air, water, rail, highway, power generation and distribution facilities and food and fuel distribution points. There will be safety concerns about the reliability of many structures like dams, levees, nuclear power plants, hazardous material storage facilities and still standing tall buildings all of which could become additional hazards. Structures may be damaged that are used to provide essential services such as hospitals, schools, police and fire departments.

Non-radioactive injuries from the blast itself would result from the human body being thrown and from impacts with objects. The detonation would produce intense heat, causing burns to exposed skin and eyes. The prompt nuclear radiation created from the initial explosion radiation may expose unprotected people to large gamma ray or neutron doses. Radioactive fallout in the form of a large dust cloud would begin within two hours after the explosion and would dissipate within minutes to weeks. The radiation from the fallout could contaminate an area for many years. The largest radiation concerns following an incident will be the radioactive material deposited on the ground, as people are evacuated from the fallout areas. These effects are likely to have significantly larger impacts on the population than internal doses, which tend to expose the body to relatively small radiation doses over a long period of time, producing different effects than large radiation doses received during a short period of time. As the distance from ground zero increases to twelve miles, injuries due to radiation exposure will decrease, and lower level contamination, evacuation, and sheltering issues will become the major concern and distances greater than 150 miles from ground zero of a nuclear detonation, acute health concerns will not become a significant issue.

== Long-term consequences ==
Years or even decades after an explosion, there will still be health concerns such as cancers in the exposed population. The number of these cancers will likely run into the thousands and cause a large social and financial cost. Historically, decontamination of sites involves the removal of all affected material, so most buildings in the immediate downwind fallout path will likely have to be destroyed in the decontamination effort. As the distance from the detonation site increases, the contamination level will decrease but buildings that have not been destroyed will require decontamination and will take years at a high financial cost at times becoming more expensive than the building itself. Roughly 3,000 square miles of land will have to undergo decontamination requiring decades and billions of dollars to complete. Service disruption will not be restored for years because the affected area will not be returned to use until the decontamination is complete and structures rebuilt. The city water supply is unlikely to become substantially contaminated with radiation by way of water main breaks, but is likely to suffer from small amounts of radiation and large amounts of debris. Replacement of lost private property and goods could add billions to the cost.

A national recession will most likely result from the attack. The volume of contaminated material that will be removed will overwhelm national hazardous waste disposal facilities and will severely challenge the nation's ability to transport material. This effort will be the most expensive and time-consuming part of recovery and will likely cost many billions of dollars and take many years.

== Call for help ==
In response a governor can request Federal assistance, including assistance under the Robert T. Stafford Disaster Relief and Emergency Assistance Act (Stafford Act), when local and State capabilities have been determined insufficient to handle the emergency and is triggered by a Presidential declaration of a major disaster or emergency. Under this directive assistance such as funding, resources, and critical services, will be provided but will always respect the sovereignty of local, tribal, and State governments while giving assistance. Furthermore, under Homeland Security Presidential Directive 5 four criteria exist for an immediate call for help from the local level to the federal government.

1. A Federal department or agency acting on its own authority has requested DHS assistance.
2. The resources of State and local authorities have become overwhelmed and Federal assistance has been requested.
3. Multiple federal departments have become substantially involved in an incident.
4. The DHS has been ordered by the President to manage the emergency response.

== Chain of command ==
Initially, local first responders such as the fire department would become the incident commanders. As the situation escalates and more and more agencies become involved, the President would have overall authority. The DHS would act in an advisory role with the Federal Emergency Management Agency (FEMA) coordinating emergency response efforts. The DOD while retaining overall authority of military forces would support the FEMA mission. The DOD would appoint a Defense Coordinating Officer (DCO) to become the central contact for the DOD and to interact with other agencies. The DHS would appoint a Federal Security Officer (FSO) to become a central official for coordination of federal resources and the central communication focus for all departments and agencies.

All federal departments and agencies requested for assistance would identify and mobilize staff and subject-matter experts to fulfill their department's responsibilities. Staff would be dispatched to the Joint Field Office (JFO), including federal officials representing those departments and agencies with specific authorities, lead personnel for the JFO Sections (Operations, Planning, Logistics, and Administration and Finance). They would begin activating federal teams and other resources as requested by DHS or in accordance with department or agency authorities. A Federal Coordinating Officer (FCO) would be named by the President to facilitate all operations becoming the central command and control officer.

The state governor would have authority over all state resources including the National Guard. The governor would also interact with other governors to bring in resources from other states. The governor has a State Coordinating Officer (SCO) in charge of allocating all of the state's response efforts in partnership with FEMA.

== Continuity of government (COG) ==
If a nuclear device were to destroy the heart of Washington, D.C., most of the leadership of the US would be destroyed with it. The highly secretive and classified COG plans or the Continuity of Government are protocols that are in place to deal with such a contingency. After a nuclear detonation near the center of Washington, D.C., the President, possibly the Vice President, and most members of Congress would be presumed dead. COG details the line of succession and prevents the US from becoming completely leaderless in the event of such an attack. It also allows the US to deal with the catastrophe, defend itself and to begin fighting a war that it would find itself in. The new leadership would be made up of unelected officials and representatives of each department and agency. These would be career officials and not political appointees. This contingency would only be in place until the Presidency and Congress can be reconstituted which could take years.

== Search and rescue ==
Local fire, police and hospitals would be overwhelmed or damaged to the point of non-functionality. The immediate search and rescue of a city struck by a nuclear explosion would be that of civilian, law enforcement or military leadership. In the case of an attack on Washington, the president or the presidential successor along with any potential surviving members of Congress, military leadership, department and agency heads, and Supreme Court justices would be high-value rescue targets. The initial rescue would be from U.S. Army helicopters stationed around the Capitol. Additional rescue personnel would begin flooding into the affected area from U.S. military sources, FEMA and civilian volunteers. Rescue efforts would be directed toward zones of survivability. The coast guard would conduct river and off shore rescue operations under the direction of FEMA. Resources from surrounding states including Fire, police, EMT and National Guard would begin arriving within 24 hours. Expected radiation levels will limit the total time workers can spend in the affected area, quickly leading to a shortage of willing, qualified, and trained workers. The United States Department of Labor would monitor the time the rescue and medical personnel working within the affected areas to insure they are not overly exposed to hazardous working conditions. The Environmental Protection Agency (EPA) would manage technical data, recommend protective measures as well as to help develop long term environmental cleanup plans.

== Medical response ==
Thousands will require decontamination and treatment. Due to a high number of casualties, the level of care may be significantly lower than normally expected. When overwhelmed with victims who need care, decisions must be made based on the fact that the sooner the onset of the symptoms, the higher the dose received and the less likely the victim is to survive even with medical intervention. This method of triage ensures that resources are best utilized in a way that will make maximum impact.

For a nuclear detonation, the most effective lifesaving activities will be those that address the evacuation or sheltering-in-place of potential victims in the immediate fallout path, the effective communication of instructions to the affected population, and the efficient decontamination of the evacuated population. The Department of Health and Human Services would issue such warnings and helping to determine potential hazards using not only loud speakers, but Twitter, Facebook, telephone and television messages. Under the DHHS there are 10,000 volunteers known as DMAT disaster medical assistance teams made up of doctors, EMTS, nurses and emergency room personnel that would be federalized and deployed within 24 hours.

The Centers for Disease Control (CDC) would monitor the spread of possible infections and diseases arising after the explosion. In doing so, they would help to contain the spread of infectious disease in what would be massive casualties from victims with now weakened immune systems and working hand in hand with the DHHS would help to bring in stock piles of medical supplies located around the country. DHHS would also rely upon the Interagency Modeling and Atmospheric Assessment Center to help determine how weather will affect the fallout from the radiation.

Three zones around the detonation area would be determined. Roughly one half mile from the explosion center would be considered the no-go zone or zone one. Here buildings are completely destroyed with the assumption of no survivability. Zone two, or the moderate damage zone, one half to one mile from the detonation site, has buildings in various states of damage with the possibility of survivors. There would be significant amounts of heat and radiation present as well as spreading flames. One to two miles from the blast epicenter is the light damage zone, or zone three, would have received damage from the blast pressure wave however the structures in this zone would be somewhat intact. Survivors here would still be exposed to radiation and have temporary or permanent blindness and injuries. In these zones would be created RTR sites a medical emergency response system for the collection of survivors directed by the DHHS. RTR 1 sites would be closest to the blast area treating the critically injured while RTR 2 sites would be stationed outside of the blast zone. RTR 3 would be designated collection points to transport the injured away from the area. Hospitals in the area would become medical centers and collection points. Assembly centers would be to gather those that are not critically injured for transport away from the area. However, this is a temporary solution because these points would become quickly overloaded and more permanent care facilities are designated in nearby cities and states. Civilian air lines, commercial trucking, buses, trains and, in case of an attack near a coastal area, cruise lines all have set aside roughly ten percent of their fleets to help transport injured persons during an emergency. Injured persons would be given color-coded tags called triage tags or DIME tags. Out of sight of the patient, the injured would be designated black for morgue expectant, red for urgent, yellow for delayed treatment and green for minimal injuries. Portable disaster morgues along with federalized morticians would be activated to collect the casualties .

== Military support ==
Only federal agencies can request Department of Defense (DOD) support of Title 10 forces. A federal agency can make the request on behalf of a state in need of assistance. The state in question must have or is expected to be incapable of responding to an emergency situation. In the case of a nuclear detonation FEMA would make the request. The DOD maintains command of the US Armed Forces but lends its support with guidance from FEMA. Title 10 forces are then activated under DSCA (Defense Support of Civil Authorities). This would allow military forces to supplement emergency responders in the disaster area. Military actions would include dispatching response units; making incident scene reports; detecting and identifying the source; establishing a perimeter; collecting information; making hazard assessments and predictions; coordinating hospital and urgent care facilities; coordinating county and state response requests; and coordinating monitoring, surveying, and sampling operations.

The resources the military could bring would be extensive using both Active Duty and Reserve military forces as well as National Guard units. Medical personnel and supplies would be brought in as well as specially trained search and rescue units trained to work in contaminated environments. Stock piles of food, water and medical supplies would also be brought to points just outside the perimeter of the disaster area for redistribution. Aircraft could be brought to transport large numbers of casualties or bring in supplies. The Army Chemical Corps would bring CBRN or Chemical, Biological, Radiological and Nuclear units to decontaminate survivors of an attack as well as personnel, vehicles and equipment entering and leaving the contamination area. Additionally, the US Army could bring in CCMRF Units. CCMRF is a Title 10 task force with both Active and Reserve Components. CCMRF's primary role when responding to a CBRN event is to augment the consequence management efforts of the first responders. The CCMRF fielding plan establishes three separate CCMRFs to provide a response capability to multiple CBRNE events. CCMRFs are identical in force structure and are self-sustaining and tailorable to any CBRNE event. A CCMRF has unique CBRNE trained personnel and equipment as well as general purpose forces trained to operate in a CBRNE environment. Survivors in such a disaster scenario could become desperate and hostile. The military would provide emergency personnel force protection such as armed escorts to ensure against possible attacks. Military forces would also be providing real time intelligence on changing ground conditions. Military forces would also quickly construct a communications network. The US Army Corps of Engineers would be able to help construct temporary shelters for the injured and emergency responders as well as to determine the soundness of structures damaged in the attack such as bridges, dams or large buildings that have the potential to become a hazard. They would also be involved in the long term rebuilding of more permanent structures as well. Naval forces would also serve as floating hospitals and treatment centers. Additionally, hundreds of members of the US Marine Corps (USMC) CBIRF or Chemical Biological and Incident Response Force would become the shock troops for search and rescue operations redeploying from locations around the world to the site of impact. The US Coast Guard (USCG) would also be helping with search and rescue and medical support but would be under the control of the DHS.

== Counter-response ==
Attribution activities at the detonation site would rely on scientific forensic techniques and would be provided by specialized national teams. Actions of incident-site personnel would include site control and criminal investigation. Federal authorities or the military would conduct apprehension activities.

After a nuclear strike the US would adopt a kind of hostage mentality. The assumption would be that there would be more than one device. A rogue nation or terrorist group could make demands and if the US did not comply they would begin detonating nuclear devices in other cities. The US Government would not know for certain if such devices existed or where they are located.

In order to counter this scenario the President or surviving successor would order a lockdown of all U.S. borders. The Department of Homeland Security would instruct the Department of Transportation (DOT), Coast Guard, Port Authority, and the U.S. Customs and Border Protection (CBP) to close all borders. The Federal Aviation Administration would issue Security Control of Air Traffic and Air Navigation Aids emergency plan or SCATANA. This would ground all commercial air traffic in the US. Flights in the air would be diverted to nearby air ports. The only air travel allowed would be DOD or emergency flights. The military would be placed at the highest readiness level, Defense Condition (DEFCON) 1, as well as the highest terrorism alert level, Force Protection Condition (FPCON) Delta.

To help determine if and where another device exists, Nuclear Emergency Support Teams (NEST) would be deployed. Consisting of hundreds of nuclear scientists, engineers and technicians, hundreds of these teams, scattered across the US, would begin searching large cities considered the most likely to be a target. They would be dressed in plains clothes riding in unmarked vehicles or helicopters using highly sensitive equipment capable of detecting radiation. Local law enforcement as well as the Federal Bureau of Investigation (FBI), the Central Intelligence Agency (CIA), and the National Security Agency (NSA) would conceivably begin the largest investigation ever conducted. The first to determine if and where other devices are located and second to determine who and where is responsible. Nuclear Forensic Teams would be deployed to the detonation site to determine where the nuclear material came from used in the making of the weapon.

Most likely a terrorist group or rogue nation would eventually step forward to claim responsibility. However, a nation doing so would face an incredible backlash in the form of an invasion or even a nuclear counter response from the US or its allies. In essence, the country responsible would become a sitting target. The more likely suspect would be a terrorist group. A terrorist cell or group would be much more difficult to track and could be spread across many countries. A criticism would be if the US were to blame the wrong country or group and attack the wrong target if no one came forward to claim responsibility.

== Documentaries ==
This scenario was explored in the 2009 History Channel documentary Day After Disaster.

== See also ==
The Textbook of Military Medicine contains material on treating injured, especially those with radiation related injuries.
