= David J. Gingery =

American machinist and author (1932–2004)

David J. Gingery (/ˈɡɪŋɡəri/; December 19, 1932 – May 3, 2004) was an American inventor, writer, and machinist, best known for his series of books on how to build machine tools.

Gingery is most famous for his Build Your Own Metal Working Shop From Scrap series, which details how to build a reasonably complete machine shop at low cost, often from scrap metal and other items. The hobbyist starts by constructing a small foundry capable of melting silicon-aluminum and zinc alloys from recycled automotive parts. Then green sand castings are used to make a metal lathe. The lathe is the first machine built since it can be used to help build itself. The lathe and foundry are then used to make more complicated machine tools.

The books in the series are, in the suggested sequence of construction:

- The Charcoal Foundry
- The Metal Lathe
- The Metal Shaper
- The Milling Machine
- The Drill Press
- The Dividing Head & Deluxe Accessories
- Designing & Building The Sheet Metal Brake

There is another book by Gingery, not usually counted as part of the series, entitled Building a Gas Fired Crucible Furnace (1988).

The dominant themes of the series are recycling, using inexpensive and free materials, and bootstrapping the shop's capabilities. Gingery is noted for using basic methods, seldom used today, in order to make it possible for a skilled hobbyist to build the machines in the book series, usually without the aid of power tools or other expensive instruments.

In addition to the Build Your Own Metal Working Shop From Scrap series, Dave Gingery and his son Vincent have published a large number of booklets on shop practices, engine construction and mechanical miscellanea.

== Personal life ==
Gingery was an amateur musician (primarily tenor banjo) and vocalist performing the music of the Great American Songbook and classic country. He was also a skilled luthier who helped his friends fix and modify their instruments, participated in many musical jam sessions in southwest Missouri and also practiced yodeling alone in his farm fields. He was married and had children.
