= Skyshine =

Schematic of skyshine effect (S: source of radiation, SH: shielding, D: detector, red arrows: paths of ionizing particles (neutrons, photons), blue line: skyshine intensity on surface with maximum M)

(Radiation) skyshine describes the ionizing radiation emitted by a nuclear technical or medical facility, reaching the facility's surroundings not directly, but indirectly through reflection and scattering at the atmosphere back to Earth's surface. This effect can happen when the shielding barrier around the source of radiation is open at the top.

== Occurrence ==
This effect can also happen when the shielding in the vault room of a linear particle accelerator in radiation therapy is not sufficient to reduce the intensity of the primary incident beam down to a very low level. For example, a member of the public may be positioned outside of such a room or vault in a nearby parking lot.

For a radiation therapy facility with limited shielding in the vault ceiling, even if the radiation is directed straight upward through the ceiling into the atmosphere, there can still be a significant amount of radiation scattering off of the atmosphere backward and at an angle. This skyshine can be measured by a medical physicist at the position of the pedestrian standing on the ground in the nearby parking lot.

== Measurement ==
Such radiation is generally measured in terms of exposure-rate or dose-rate. It has been shown that this downward intensity is heavily dependent on the shape of the beam. Regardless of whether the upward incident beam is shaped like a circle, square or rectangle, specific calculation formalism has been described. The intensity of radiation measured at the surface immediately surrounding the facility increases with growing distance from the shielding barrier to reach a maximum and then fall again continuously with further increasing distance. Depending on the energy of the scattering radiation, the intensity maximum is reached at different distances from the vault. For example, x-rays emitted from linear accelerators reached maxima of 18 MeV at a distance of 13.6 m and 6 MeV at 4.6 m in studies.

== Incidents ==
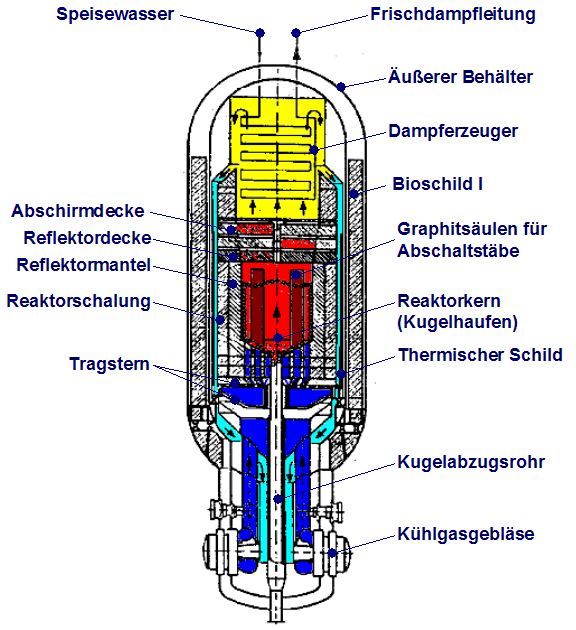
Schematic of AVR reactor originally without top shielding

Between 1967 and 1975 significant radiation damage of the surroundings was caused by radiation skyshine at and near the AVR reactor in Jülich, Germany, which, in its original BBC construction, lacked a top shielding barrier.

In 2011, the skyshine effect reached media attention in the controversy around the radioactive waste repository Gorleben after higher levels of radiation were measured outside the facility, despite it being shielded by a shielding wall.

== Alternative use for indirect radiation from the sun ==
The term "skyshine" has been to refer to the sun's rays that are reflected from the sky and clouds in contradistinction to the rays received directly from the sun itself. Thus an object placed in shade is still exposed to rays from the sun.
