= Jonesite =

General
- Category: Inosilicates
- Formula: Ba_{4}(K,Na)_{2}[Ti_{4}Al_{2}Si_{10}O_{36}]•6H_{2}O
- IMA symbol: Jon
- Crystal system: Monoclinic
- Crystal class: Prismatic (2/m) (same H-M symbol)
- Space group: P2_{1}/m
- Unit cell: a = 10.618, b = 25.918 c = 8.6945 [Å]; β = 127.633°; Z = 4

Identification
- Formula mass: 914.93 g/mol
- Color: Colorless
- Crystal habit: Bladed– Aggregation is thin blade-like crystals and Tabular– Dimensions thin in one direction
- Cleavage: {010} Distinct
- Fracture: Irregular
- Mohs scale hardness: 3–4
- Luster: Vitreous
- Streak: White
- Diaphaneity: Transparent
- Specific gravity: 3.21 g/cm^{3}
- Density: 3.25 g/cm^{3}
- Optical properties: Biaxial (+), a=1.641, b=1.66, g=1.682, bire=0.0410
- Refractive index: Index: 1.64 to 1.68
- Birefringence: δ = 0.041
- Pleochroism: Colorless
- Other characteristics: Has medium relief and weak dispersion. Has fluorescent luminescence & white streak Year of Discovery:1977

Jonesite is a mineral with the chemical formula Ba_{4}(K,Na)_{2}[Ti_{4}Al_{2}Si_{10}O_{36}]*6H_{2}O. This mineral is named after Francis Tucker Jones (1905–1993), who discovered the mineral while working as a Research Chemical Microscopist at Berkeley in CA. Jonesite has diffraction symmetry of mmm, which implies an orthorhombic system with all three axes perpendicular to each other and the angles between each axis equal to 90 degrees. In addition to symmetrical properties, Jonesite is a biaxial mineral with birefringence, which is a term to describe the difference between index of refraction. Jonesite is anisotropic, meaning the speed of light changes through the mineral, so the mineral shows color when viewed in crossed polarized light under a microscope. The mineral also has medium relief, which is a measure of how well the mineral stands out when viewed under a microscope in plane polarized light. In addition to being one of the rarest minerals in the Benitoite Gem mine located in California, Jonesite also is the first titanosilicate mineral with a porous double-layered crystal structure. This discovery is important because titanosilicate frameworks have industrial uses in energy companies and are used in containing radioactive waste.
