= Landysh =

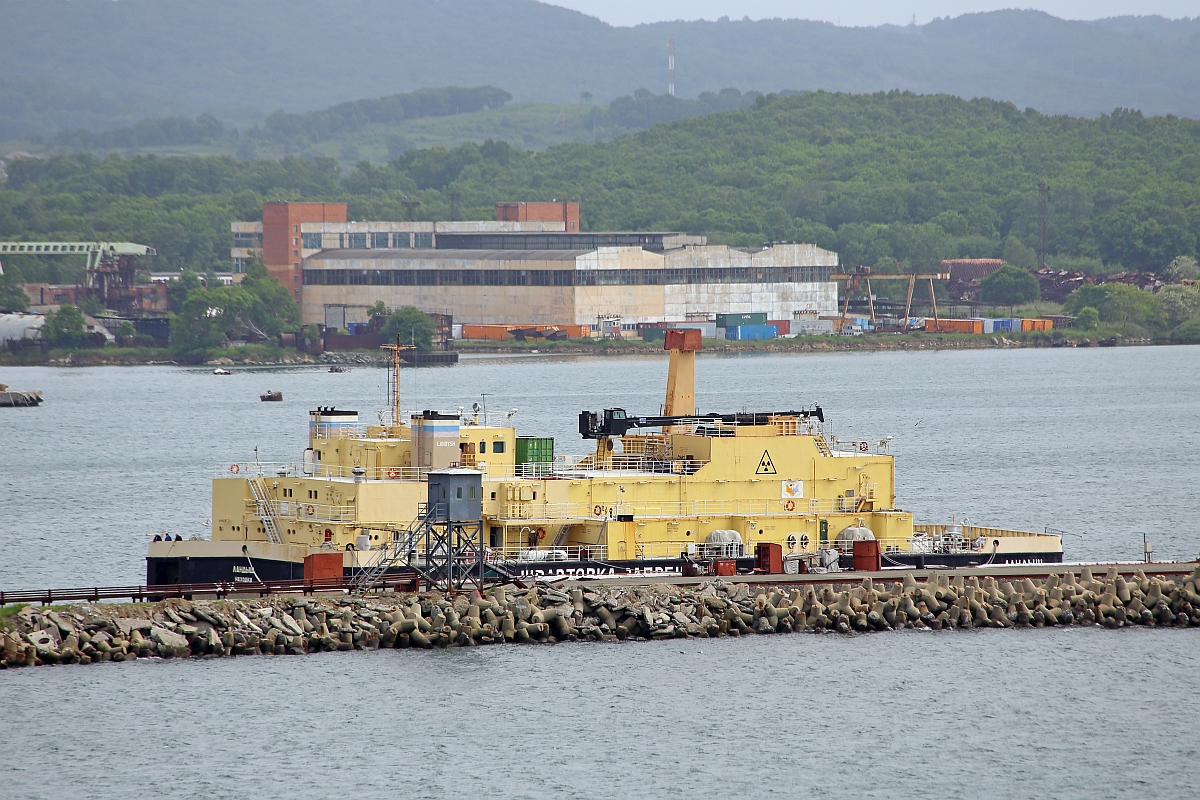
- Landysh in Bolshoy Kamen, 2015

History

Russia
- Name: Landysh
- Builder: Amur Shipbuilding Plant
- Laid down: 1997
- Commissioned: 2000

General characteristics
- Displacement: 3,900
- Length: 65 m (213 ft 3 in)
- Beam: 23.4 m (76 ft 9 in)
- Height: 6.6 m (21 ft 8 in)
- Draught: 3.5 m (11 ft 6 in)
- Crew: 46

Landysh (Russian: Ландыш, lit. 'Lily of the Valley'; known as Suzuran in Japan) is a floating facility for processing contaminated water produced when decommissioning nuclear submarines. It was built in Russia with funds from Japan as part of an agreement on nuclear arms disposal, but has not left the wharf. Japan requested that Russia send Landysh to help in the aftermath of the Fukushima Daiichi nuclear disaster.

== History ==
In 1972 the Convention on the Prevention of Marine Pollution by Dumping of Wastes and Other Matter was held and in 1975 the Soviet Union ratified the agreement to limit the dumping of high-level radioactive wastes in the oceans. In 1983 many Convention members signed a voluntary moratorium on all dumping of radioactive wastes at sea, but the USSR did not sign and continued to dispose of low-level radioactive reactor coolant water from its nuclear submarines. Leaks and intentional releases of radioactive materials from Russian facilities in the Far East prompted Japan to offer financial aid for Russia to build facilities to treat low-level radioactive water in 1994. By 1996 a design for a floating processing facility was accepted and contracts issued to the Tomen Corporation (Japan), Babcock & Wilcox (USA) and the Amur Shipbuilding Plant (Russia). Landysh was built at the Amur shipyard in Komsomolsk-on-Amur, completed in 1998 and commissioned in 2000. Landysh remained at Zvezda shipyard in Bolshoy Kamen until 2011. As of 9 May 2011 discussions between Rosatom, the Russian nuclear agency, and Japan concerning the dispatch of Landysh to Japan were still ongoing. Japanese reluctance to accept Russian assistance may be linked to the Kuril Islands dispute between Russia and Japan.

== Description ==
Landysh is a barge and must be towed from one location to another. It is 65 m (213 ft) long, 23.4 m (77 ft) wide, and has a double hull; its waste-treatment facility has thick concrete walls to prevent spills. It displaces 3,900 tonnes and carries a crew of 46.

== Capabilities ==
There are conflicting reports about what level of radioactivity can be in the water processed by Landysh; some sources state that it can only process low-level water whilst other sources state it can handle medium- and low-level water; all sources agree that it can process up 7,000 m^{3} per year. There have been questions raised about the effectiveness of the decontamination process, especially regarding the removal of caesium-137. Landysh uses a combination of filtration, ion exchange and reverse osmosis to remove radioactive material from water. After collecting and concentrating the radioactive materials, they are mixed with cement and placed in 200-litre barrels for further radioactive waste management.
