= Upshot-Knothole Annie =

U.S. nuclear weapons test

Coordinates: 37.0477°N 116.022°W

Upshot–Knothole Annie
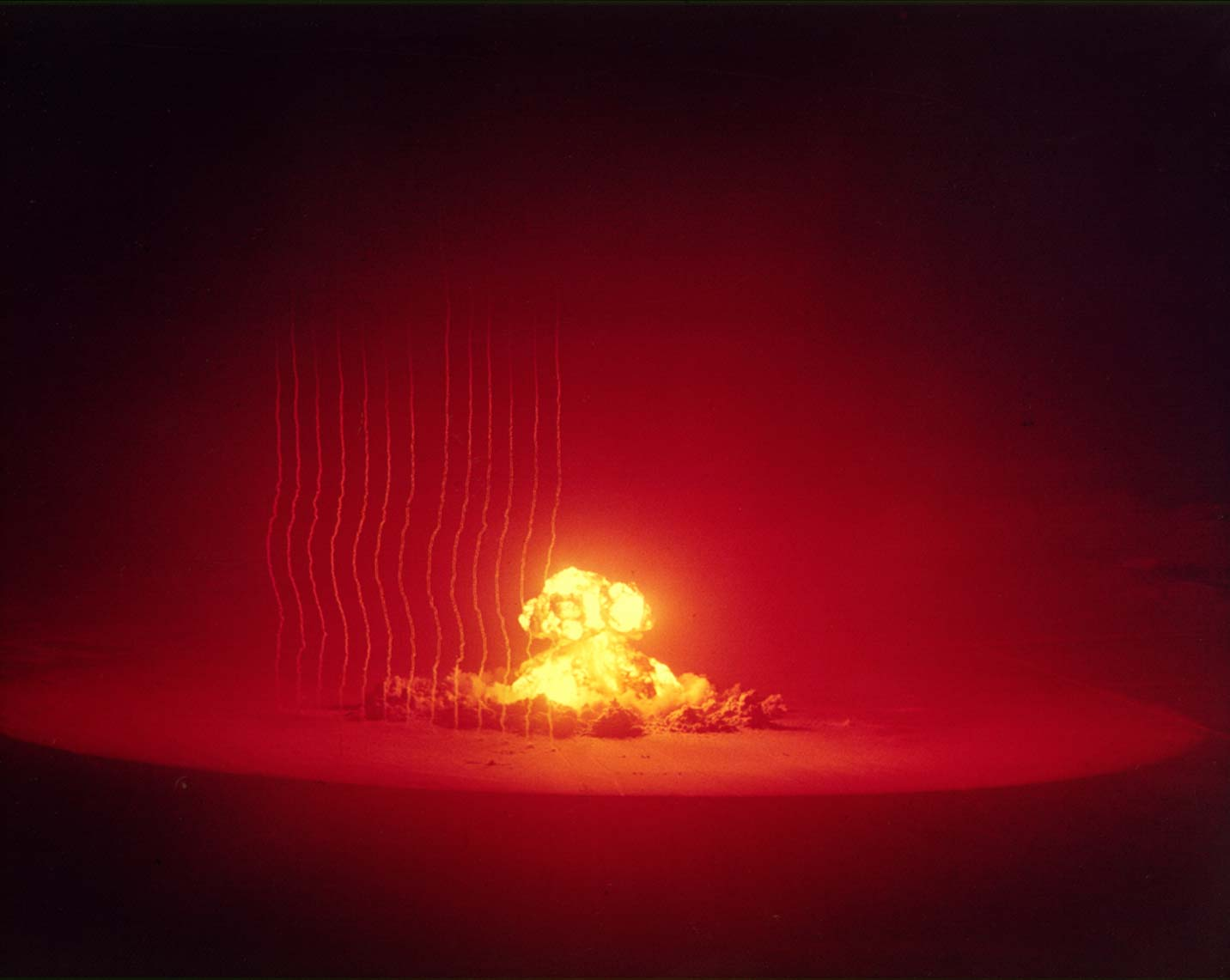

Information
- Country: United States
- Test series: Operation Upshot–Knothole
- Test site: Nevada Test Site
- Date: March 17, 1953
- Test type: Atmospheric
- Yield: 16 kt

Test chronology

Upshot–Knothole Annie was one of eleven nuclear weapons tests conducted by the United States as part of Operation Upshot–Knothole. It took place at the Nevada Test Site on 17 March 1953, and was nationally televised. The device used in the blast was a 16 kt Mark 5 Nuclear Bomb - a low yield fission weapon, detonated 90 meters / 300 feet above the ground. The live TV coverage was recorded on a kinescope, so it is a rare record of the sound an actual atomic bomb makes.

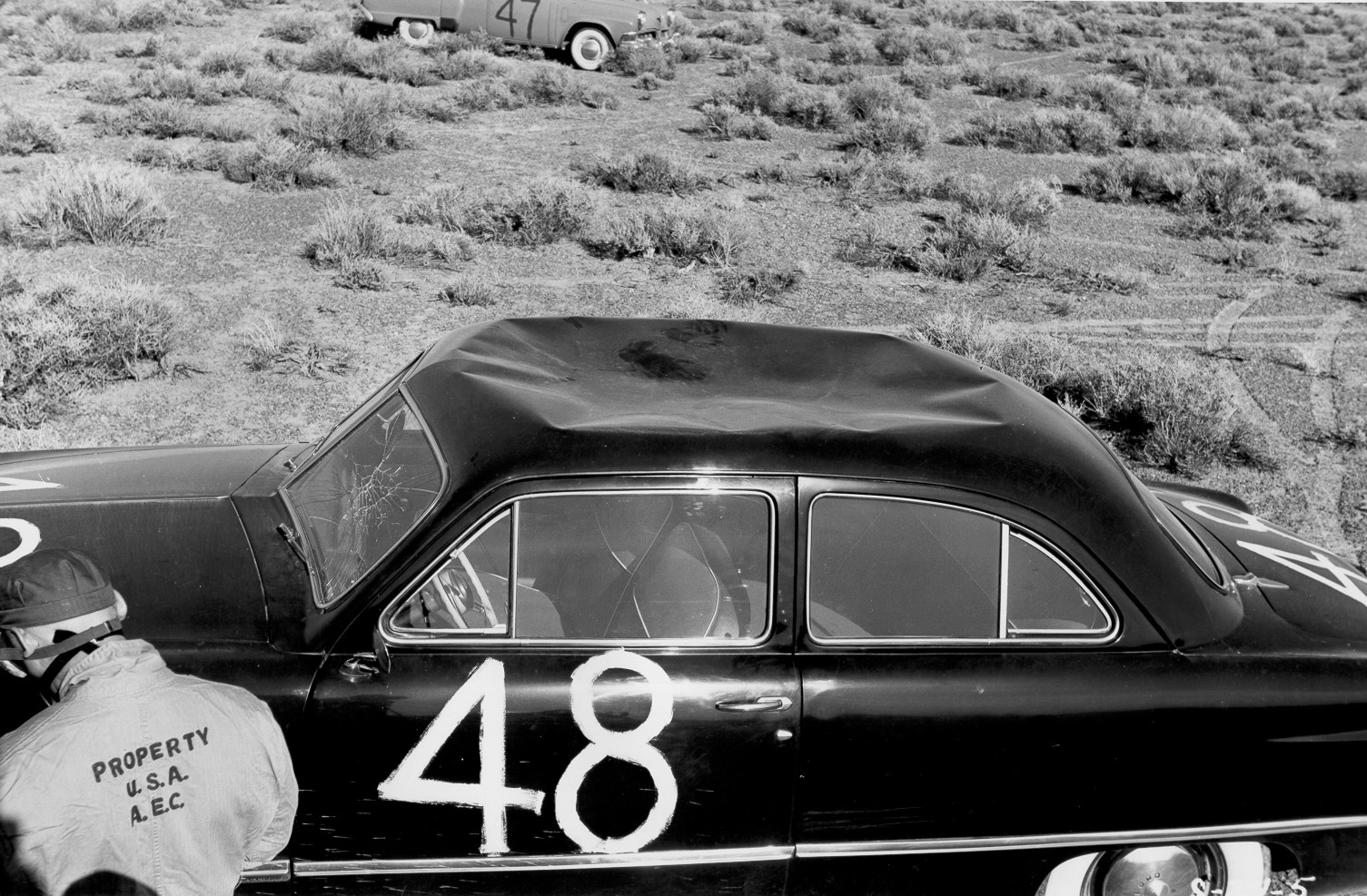
One of the automobiles after the test.

Operation Doorstep was a civil defense study conducted by the Federal Civil Defense Administration (FCDA) in conjunction with Annie. It studied the effect of a 16 kiloton nuclear blast on two wooden frame houses, mannequins, fifty automobiles and eight bomb shelters designed for residential use. Attached to the automobiles were instruments to measure heat and radiation. United States troops, television broadcasters, and FCDA officials watched the blast from a trench seven and a half miles away.

The administration concluded that a car would be "relatively safe" from a small nuclear bomb at least ten blocks away if windows were left open to prevent the car collapsing on its occupants. Notably, most of the automobiles were able to be driven away after the blast. The homes in the study were constructed in such a way as to minimize the thermal effects of Annie, with an eye towards determining if, in the absence of fire, the basement of the closer home — 3,500 feet (1,100 m) from the hypocenter — might shelter its occupants, while the second — at 7,500 feet (2,300 m) — could remain standing. Both homes performed as expected under the conditions of their construction. The first of these buildings was destroyed, with the basement remaining intact. The second building was damaged, yet remained standing.
