= Bontarō Dokuyama =

Japanese contemporary artist

Bontarō Dokuyama (毒山凡太朗, Dokuyama Bontarō, b. 1984) is a Japanese contemporary artist from Fukushima who employs a wide range of methodologies and approaches in his body of work, including political activism, interviews, installation, and video.

Dokuyama was deeply impacted by the 2011 Great East Japan Earthquake and the nuclear disaster that followed. Having worked as an architectural designer, he decided to start over as an artist after witnessing the destruction of his hometown in Fukushima prefecture. His works are primarily political. He regularly engages with places, people, and issues that have been obscured in contemporary Japanese society, revealing the memories and emotions of those who have been left out or forgotten in mainstream historical discourse. Dokuyama often incorporates satire and humor into his artworks as a method for reframing the realities of certain socio-political issues in order to stimulate audiences to reconsider their dependency on social mechanisms.

Dokuyama has been active as an artist since 2014, and has engaged with various controversial political topics in his body of work, including nuclear displacement, 'comfort' women, Japan's colonization of Taiwan, and the 2020 Tokyo Olympics. His works are in the collections of the Hiroshima City Museum of Contemporary Art and Mori Art Museum in Japan, and Kadist in Paris and San Francisco. In 2017, he was selected as a candidate for the 20th Taro Okamoto Award; and in 2018, he participated in the Art Action UK artist residency in London.

== Early life and engagement with art ==
Born as an identical twin in Tamura City, Fukushima Prefecture, Dokuyama lived there until he was 18 years old. He initially studied microbiology in university, but shifted to pursue design at a vocational school before going on to work as an architectural designer in Tokyo for seven years.

Dokuyama decided to quit his job and become an artist after the Great East Japan Earthquake of 2011 and its nuclear fallout destroyed his hometown. He saw a number of artworks emerging about the disaster in the Tōhoku region, but found that not many artist voices from Fukushima actually contributed to the narrative. Dokuyama has stated that he wanted to be an artist since college, and felt in the aftermath of the 2011 disaster that he needed to shed his life as a "company slave" in which the dreams and lives of workers were tamed for the sake of corporate and societal structures. He "sens[ed] that everything that had been taught to him was a lie," and decided to start over completely under the new name Dokuyama Bontaro. He was given the artist name by his artist friend Kazama Sachiko, with the characters for Dokuyama (毒山) meaning 'poison mountain' in an homage to his birthplace and Bontarō (凡太朗) referring to Bontarō Saikawa, the pen name of the anarchist and manga artist Katsura Mochizuki.

Dokuyama completed the "Genius High School" contemporary art seminar taught by Ryūta Ushiro, a member of the artist collective Chim↑Pom, at the alternative art school Bigakkō, where he was introduced to other politically engaged young artists. In his artwork, Dokuyama employs documentation and humor to create installations, videos, and paintings that foreground socio-political narratives that have become difficult to see in contemporary society.

== Selected artworks ==
Dokuyama has engaged with various controversial aspects of Japan's history, including nuclear displacement, 'comfort' women, and Japan's colonization of Taiwan. Having been deeply affected by the Fukushima disaster's impact on his hometown, the artist emphasizes the unpredictability of the contemporary world, exploring what it means to belong to a society in which people are too busy working to pay attention to the realities of politics and history. He often produces artworks based on interviews conducted while visiting locales where controversial incidents and events have occurred and been mediatized, investigating firsthand memories of these incidents as a way to reveal new truths, emotions, and histories that have been obscured by the pressures of meainstream society. Throughout his body of work, Dokuyama has attempted to maintain a neutral gaze from behind the camera, encouraging the personal testimonies and thoughts of participating interviewees and witnesses to waver audience perceptions regarding particular socio-political issues.

=== Even after 1,000 Years (2015) and Over There (2015) ===
In 2015, Dokuyama returned to Fukushima Prefecture for the first time since the 2011 Great East Japan Earthquake, where he took part in a joint exhibition with the artist duo Kyun-Chome at Nao Nakamura's gallery space in Iwaki City. In addition to exhibiting some earlier artworks, Dokuyama produced the short video piece Even after 1,000 Years and the three-channel video installation Over There for the exhibition. In their exhibition statement, the artists pointed out the irony of the name of the Jōban-sen railway that connects Tōhoku to Tokyo and runs through their respective home prefectures of Fukushima and Ibaraki. Jōban (常磐) denotes eternal immortality, imbuing the railway with a sense of security and longevity that was shattered after the triple disaster. The section of the Jōban-sen railway that runs through the exclusion zone was shut down for nine years following the 2011 disaster.

Dokuyama claimed that he was led back home by the late Chieko Takamura, an artist from Fukushima that is posthumously considered a local celebrity. For Even after 1,000 Years, Dokuyama was inspired by "Chieko's Sky (智恵子抄, Chieko-shō, literally "Selections of Chieko") a book of poems written by Chieko's husband Kōtarō Takamura. He followed the poem "Childlike story" (あどけない話, Adokenai hanashi), in which Chieko longs for the sky above Mount Adatara in Fukushima as the "real sky" that she can nostalgically recall from her childhood. In the video, Dokuyama stands in the pouring rain atop Mount Adatara and calls out for Chieko, pointing to the sky and shouting over and over that it is the only "real sky" and that all other skies are fake. In his artist statement, he wrote that despite the ramifications of the triple disaster, "this sky is without a doubt the same as it was five years ago, and it will not change even after a thousand years."

For the video installation Over There (2015), Dokuyama worked with communities who had been evacuated from their homes in 2011 due to the nuclear fallout of the Fukushima Daichi Nuclear PowerPlant accident and were still living in 'temporary' housing four years later. He facilitated workshops in which displaced citizens from Fukushima's various exclusion zones decorated masks using paint and local newspaper clippings to represent the hometowns they hoped to return to one day. Dokuyama, who was also still unable to return to his own hometown at the time, then recorded the participants wearing their masks in front of their temporary homes and pointing silently in the direction of their abandoned homes. For the final installation, Dokuyama placed the masks into glass cases and mounted them amongst a three-channel video loop of the residents pointing. Over There brings attention to how—five years later—the disaster was still far from over for those displaced by the Fukushima disaster. It also emphasized the manner in which the displaced have been subordinated as silent "disaster victims," attempting to relieve them from this position by underlining their individual subjectivity.

=== The 4th branch, Ministry of Economy, Trade and Industry (2016) ===
The 4th branch, Ministry of Economy, Trade and Industry concerns the anti-nuclear protest tents that were erected in front of the Ministry of Economy, Trade and Industry buildings in Tokyo from September 2011 until they were forcibly removed by the government in 2016. Dokuyama proposed that the anti-nuclear encampment be made into a permanent facility, engaging with the activist community to collect input so that he could create architectural models of their 'ideal' facilities. According to Dokuyama, two officials from the Ministry came across his project on social media and were able to visit the tents under the auspices of art, thus creating a rare opportunity for government officials to engage with the community of anti-nuclear activists living in the tents. By creating models of the fictional 4th branch, the artist reconsidered the city as a public space that could be rented, encouraging viewers to envision an image of Tokyo that could exist within a shared system of partial ownership.

When the government forced the end of the anti-nuclear occupation in 2016, Dokuyama salvaged protest banners from the tents. He has included these banners in installations of The 4th branch, Ministry of Economy, Trade and Industry in exhibitions in Japan as well as in Copenhagen, Denmark, as part of "If Only Radiation Had Color: The Era of Fukushima" exhibition series at X AND BEYOND in 2017.

=== The War is Over! (2017) ===
For The War is Over!, Dokuyama recorded himself shouting "War is over!" at several significant locations in Okinawa in a direct reference to the Battle of Okinawa, one of the deadliest battles of the Asia Pacific War. During his first visit to Okinawa, the artist felt a distinctive consciousness about how belonging to the Japanese nation varies in different localities, and began to think more about the complicated intersection of emotion, memory, and history. For this piece, Dokuyama used satirical humor to critically approach the continued presence of the American military bases in Okinawa despite the war being over long ago.

In 2018, The War is Over! was included in ASIA NOW Paris Asian Art Fair as part of the exhibition "Transitional" curated by Reiko Tsubaki and Hirokazu Tokuyama of the Mori Art Museum.

=== Innocent Tale of the Sky (2019) ===
Innocent Tale of the Sky (2019) consists of a man viewing various construction sites for the 2020 Tokyo Olympics, gesturing dramatically towards the construction cranes and shouting demands for Tokyo's sky to be filled by new buildings—taller, higher, and filled with "Japanese power." This piece is a companion piece to Dokuyama's Even after 1,000 Years from 2015; it was also inspired by the Fukushima-born artist Chieko Takamura and the collection of poems Chieko's Sky written by her husband Kōtarō Takamura.

In 2019, Dokuyama exhibited both Innocent Tale of the Sky and Even after 1,000 Years as part of "Tokyo Plan 2019" at gallery αM at Musashino Art University. He was selected by curator Yabumae Tomoko as the first artist in a 5-volume exhibition series that dealt with issues related to Tokyo's urban transformation in anticipation of the 2020 Summer Olympic Games. Exhibited together, Dokuyama's videos emphasize the socioeconomic imbalance between Tokyo and Fukushima, locating the "sky" in rural and urban areas as a public space that cannot be owned by anyone. Both videos also brought attention to the apparent aimlessness of voicing one's opinion loudly in Japanese society. As the videos of the men pointing and shouting wildly were looped in the exhibition space, their shouts seemed to lose all meaning and disappear.

=== My Anthem (2019) ===
In 2019, Dokuyama produced My Anthem (2019), a 20-minute video for which the artist interviewed an elderly Taiwanese choir group who were educated under the Japanese colonial regime and still spoke the language fluently. The video opens with footage of the Imperial Japanese rising sun flag, confronting viewers with the country's repressed colonial legacy and history of military aggression before presenting testimonies of the Taiwanese interviewees' experiences growing up as Japanese Imperial subjects. They showcase the entrenched impacts of Japan's ideological assimilation policies, with the interviewees singing popular Japanese war songs and reciting the Imperial Rescript on Education from memory.

My Anthem was exhibited together with Over There (2015) as part of "Roppongi Crossing: Connexions," at the Mori Art Museum in Tokyo in 2019. Exhibited together, the artworks connected two groups that have been marginalized and displaced, showcasing unexpected commonalities between two disparate communities that gestured towards a continuity of structural violence from Japan's past to its present day.

=== Synchronized Cherry Blossom (2019) ===
Dokuyama created the installation Synchronized Cherry Blossom for the 2019 Aichi Triennale, where it was exhibited in Nagoya's popular Endoji Hommachi shopping arcade. In an ode to uirō, a Japanese rice jelly sweet that is famous in Nagoya, Dokuyama and his assistant created 30,000 identical pieces of the sticky candy by hand, molding them into light pink cherry blossoms and mounting them onto the branches of a real cherry tree, alluding to the prevalence of Japan's national symbols. After researching the history of the sweet, Dokuyama found that ūiro had become a symbol for Nagoya when the 1964 Olympics brought the shinkansen to the city and ūiro was sold on the train as the city's official snack. In addition to the cherry tree, Dokuyama produced videos of interviews with local Nagoya residents, officials from a local uirō manufacturer, pro-urban development city officials, and people in Russian and Chinese cities once occupied by Japan. In this work, Dokuyama considers how most of the cherry trees that can be found in Japan and are associated as a symbol of the country (Somei Yoshino cherry trees) have been agriculturally cultivated as genetically-identical clones. By grouping these seemingly disparate elements together, Synchronized Cherry Blossom highlighted the way that Japan's national architecture, symbols, and culture—and correlating ideas of "Japanese-ness"—have not necessarily developed organically, but have rather have been fabricated throughout history as part of Japan's complicated national discourse.

== Selected exhibitions ==
- 2020 - "SAKURA," LEESAYA, Meguro, Tokyo, Japan
- 2019 - "Aichi Triennale: "Taming Y/Our Passion," Aichi Triennale, Nagoya, Japan
- 2019 - "Plans for Tokyo 2019, Vol.1: RENT TOKYO," gallery αM, Tokyo, Japan
- 2019 - "Roppongi Crossing 2019: Connexions," Mori Art Museum, Tokyo, Japan
- 2018 - "Public archive," AOYAMAMEGURO, Tokyo, Japan / Assembling, K11 Art Mall, Shenyang, China
- 2017 - "Double Façade: Multiple ways to encounter the Other," Koganecho Bazaar 2017, Kanagawa, Japan
- 2017 - ""If Only Radiation Had Color: The Era of Fukushima," X AND BEYOND, Copenhagen, Denmark
- 2016 - "The 4th branch, Ministry of Economy, Trade and Industry" Anti-nuclear Occupy Tent Museum, Kasumigaseki, Tokyo, Japan
- 2016 - "Shudder and Orgasm," Komagome SOKO, Tokyo, Japan
- 2015 - "I can also hear you today" (今日もきこえる), Nao Nakamura, Iwaki City, Fukushima, Japan

== See also ==
- Chim↑Pom
- Kyun-Chome
- Fujii Hikaru
- Kato Tsubasa
- Koki Tanaka
- Meiro Koizumi
- Yamashiro Chikako
- Yanagi Yukinori
- Shimada Yoshiko
