= Hikaru Fujii =

Japanese contemporary artist (born 1976)

Hikaru Fujii (藤井光, Hikaru Fujii; born 1976) is a contemporary Japanese artist who explores the relationship between art, history, and social activism. Primarily working in documentary film and multi-channel video installation, Fujii employs archival research, fieldwork, interviews, and workshops to create artworks to examine the relationships between historical narrative and education, structural violence, crisis, race, and power. Of particular interest for him are the role and responsibility of museums and institutions as sites that preserve and perpetuate specific historical narratives. After the 2011 Great East Japan Earthquake and nuclear disaster, Fujii has actively documented the disaster and raised awareness around the world about the situation in Japan.

Fujii has exhibited his work internationally, including Museum of Contemporary Art, Tokyo (MOT); National Museum of Modern Art, Tokyo; 2019 Aichi Triennale, Nagoya; Sendai Mediatheque, Sendai; Aomori Contemporary Art Centre, Aomori; National Museum of Modern and Contemporary Art, Seoul (MMCA); Kadist, Paris; and the Onassis Cultural Centre, Athens, among others. He won the Grand Prix for the Nissan Art Award in 2017, and the Tokyo Contemporary Art Award in 2020, alongside Chikako Yamashiro. He lives and works in Tokyo.

== Education and artistic approach ==
Fujii was born in Tokyo in 1976. He spent 10 years outside of Japan, primarily living in Paris, France, where he acquired a diploma from the École nationale supérieure des Arts Décoratifs, and then a Diplôme d'études approfondies (DEA) in Aesthetics, Sciences and Technology of the Arts from the University of Paris 8 in 2004. He returned to Japan in 2005 for an artist residency at ARCUS studio in Moriya, Ibaraki, where he explored the possibilities and dangers of video as a medium that captures social and political events. He had intended only to return to Japan temporarily, but when curators told him the difficulty of developing political artworks in Japan, he decided he wanted to confront these difficulties and investigate the politics of artistic expression and production at home.

Fujii has continued to explore the relationship between artistic production and the socio-political systems of power present in existing systems and structures, creating installations by using video and photography as a medium through which to question, confront and reinterpret historical moments and hegemonic norms. He regularly incorporates history and temporality into his work, and has stated that "in [his] artistic practice [he] always thinks about various notions of time."

While living in France, Fujii considered himself more of an "observer" of society, but upon returning to Japan he became more involved in society and possibilities of political resistance; the artist has admitted that his friends in France considered him to be a cultural anthropologist, and in Japan "[he] became an activist."

== History and society ==
Fujii believes that artistic production is closely related to society and history, and employs archival research and extensive field work to create artworks that consider the relationships between art, education, structural violence, and power. He primarily works in documentary film and multi-channel video installation, and often incorporates interactive and participatory approaches in his works, such as interviews, documentary testimonies, workshops, and symposia. He often employs tactics to facilitate active and lively discussions. Fujii stated in a 2016 interview with Kanransha Gallery owner Ōtani Yoshihisa, that contemporary art itself has a background that began with references to history; inheriting, destroying, and creating the past. In other words, I don't think contemporary art has ever stopped considering history."

With his interest in history and historical narrative, Fujii's artwork often explores the position of museums and cultural institutions, education practices, and social systems in Japan and Asia, including racial divisions, war memory, and colonial legacies. He is interested in the role, responsibility, and power of museums as places that preserve history and perpetuate specific narratives and biases.

=== The construction of history is dedicated to the memories of the unnamed (2015) ===
In 2015, curator Hattori Hiroyuki invited Fujii to be a guest curator of the Aomori Contemporary Art Center's (ACAC) "Aomori City Archives Exhibition" series, which aims to use the cultural artefacts and artworks belonging to the former Keiko Kan Folk Heritage Museum of Aomori and "reveal the 100-year history of Japan's modernization" alongside the histories of Aomori and its community. The former Keiko Kan had been responsible for the collection and preservation of Ainu archival materials, folk crafts and objects from the Aomori and Ezo regions before it was forced to close in early 2006 due to financial difficulties. The "Aomori City Archives Exhibition" was held annually by the ACAC from 2013-2017, inviting contemporary artists to curate the Keiko Kan's collection with a new perspective.

For his exhibition, Fujii used various everyday objects and archival materials to show a modernization narrative centered around the changing lives of locals in the Aomori region, bringing particular attention to the "memories of the unknown people" stored in the now-defunct Keiko Kan; he tried to bring forth the histories of marginalized groups and those oppressed in the region by the nationalization of Japan—namely, the "unnamed" of modern Japan's historical narrative. The artist arranged 5 different stages of the exhibition into scenes like a movie set, tracing 100 years of history between the local Aomori region and the Japanese nation.

While the museum collection consisted primarily of everyday objects or artefacts of daily use, Fujii also called upon people living Aomori Prefecture to share home videos shot on 8mm film from 1955-75 to be part of the exhibition, as a way to show the social situation and share personal, modest, daily moments deemed unimportant to larger narratives of history. As a popular and affordable medium during those years, 8mm film captured footage from a period of particularly high growth for the nation, providing a window into the rapidly changing physical and social landscape of Japan. These activities were supported by "remo," an organization based in Osaka that works to collect 8mm films from around Japan to record lost archives of Japanese social history.

=== Playing Japanese (2017) ===
Playing Japanese (2017) is a video and photographic installation aimed to examine Japan's historical contact with foreign entities, inspired by a British clergyman H.N. Hutchinson's 1901 ethnological study "The living races of mankind," as well as the Osaka Expo of 1903 which featured imperialist displays of indigenous peoples from Okinawa, Hokkaido, Taiwan and Korea in its anthropological "human exhibit." Playing Japanese shared multi-channel footage from a two-day public workshop that Fujii organized about preconceived notions of "Japanese-ness," in which members of the public were invited to "perform" what they felt it meant to be Japanese, reenacting historical texts about the1903 Osaka Expo's human exhibit, and acting as Japanese people examining the differences and commonalities of people's perceptions towards the indigenous populations included in the exhibition. The work highlights the violent history of anthropology as a discipline that was once used to build up Japan's national identity and imperialist vision. The film style and lighting highlighted the facial features of participants. Fujii stated his hope that through this work, people can “examine carefully the ways we are the same as people in the past, and the ways that we are different.”

Fujii won the 2017 Nissan Art Award for Playing Japanese.

=== The Primary Fact (2018) ===
As a result of winning Grand Prix of the 2017 Nissan Art Award, Fujii was able to participate in a three-month residency at the International Studio & Curatorial Program (ISCP) in New York City. During the residency he prepared The Primary Fact (2018), which had been originally commission and produced for the 2018 Onassis Fast Forward Festival in Athens, Greece. Fujii also exhibited The Primary Fact at ISCP as part of his residency, cumulating in his first solo exhibition in the United States.

The Primary Fact consists of a seven-channel video and photography installation based on the artist's research into a 7th century BC mass gravesite in Greece that was excavated during the construction of a park in 2016. Based on his research, Fujii speculatively explored the possibility of the eighty shackled skeletons found during the excavation as having been executed after resisting the emergence of democracy in Greece in the Classical Age; the skeletons were in good health and clothed when they died, which indicates that they were likely of aristocratic background. For the artwork, Fujii reenacted the moment of the mass execution as the main focus of the artwork, working with choreographer Patricia Apergi to direct a choreographed performance of all Greek male actors capturing the final moments of those killed due to the rise of democracy. The title of the piece refers to how the artefacts uncovered during the excavation evidence the "primary fact" or their execution, but with no context or detail as to how or why it came about.

== Catastrophe and Society (2011 Tōhoku earthquake and tsunami) ==
Fujii was in Tokyo when the 2011 Great East Japan Earthquake hit. He immediately started listening to the stories of artists and cultural practitioners who had experienced the Kobe earthquake in 1995, before traveling to the afflicted Tōhoku region only three weeks after the earthquake to document the aftermath. His objective was to create records of cultural activities in the aftermath of the disaster, which did not exist for the 1995 earthquake.

Fujii was involved with the recorder311 (center for remembering 3.11) project at Sendai Mediatheque, a platform for citizens, researchers, and artists to collaboratively document the process of the impacted region's recovery and reconstruction. He produced a short film Skate Park (CDP), Arahama, Wakabayashi-ku, Sendai, Miyagi about a man creating a skatepark called Carpe Diem Park for locals to enjoy on the land where his house used to be located before it was destroyed by the tsunami. In 2015, this short film (6 min) was exhibited as part of an exhibition at Sendai Mediateque entitled "Recording in Progress, Archives Exhibition and Screenings: the center for remembering 3.11."

Fujii also created a 12-min short film called Recording of a Coastal Landscape (2012), an unembellished recording of a sunrise unfolding along the coast in the small town of Iitate. The film proceeds with no camera movement or added sound throughout, concluding with a small white text that designates the town's coordinates and radiation level, indicating the ominous new set of data that will forever be inscribed upon this region due to the nuclear disaster.

Fujii has been critical about the rise of nationalism in the wake of the disaster. In 2011, Fujii went to the Yamaguchi Center for Arts and Media (YCAM) to give a lecture and said he could feel the rise of the "national polity" in the air, and that a new kind of nationalism has been conveniently created out of the crisis.

=== Project Fukushima! (2012) ===
While documenting the aftermath of the tsunami as part of the recorder311 project with Sendai Mediatheque, Fujii was asked by Japanese musician, Yoshihide Ōtomo, to create a documentary film that recorded the preparations, discussions, and activities of the music festival "Project Fukushima!," which attracted more than 10,000 visitors to the city of Fukushima only 5 months after the nuclear disaster crippled the region. Fujii produced the resulting film, entitled Project Fukushima!, over the course of seven months, focusing on the music and arts of the festival as well as the attitudes of participants and the ethical questions and conflicts faced by the organizers. Project Fukushima! is 90-minutes in length and has been screened in various cities, including the U.K., and the U.S.

=== ASAHIZA: Where do humans go? (2013) ===
Fujii directed ASAHIZA: Where do humans go?, a 74-minute film documenting people's memories and experiences surrounding a small wooden theatre called "Asahiza" in Minamisōma, Fukushima Prefecture, a town about 30 km from the Fukushima Daiichi Nuclear Power Plant. Asahiza had originally opened in 1923, the same year of the Great Kantō Earthquake, and had been an important cultural center for the city before eventually declining into disrepair as the city's population fell. Although the theatre officially closed in 1991, it was not damaged by the 2011 disaster, and local citizens have been fighting to register it as a cultural site for the city in order to receive national funds for its restoration and preservation.

For this film, Fujii first documented interviews with locals from the quiet town of Minamisōma reminiscing about Asahiza and its impact on the area, then recorded a group of visitors from the urban capital of Tokyo coming to Minamisōma and watching the half-finished film in the Asahiza theatre. The completed film combines both parts, and sets it to a musical score created by Yoshihide Ōtomo.

Fujii also screened his film Project Fukushima! at the Asahiza theatre in Minamisōma.

=== Les nucléaires et les choses (2019) ===
Fujii was selected for an artist residency at Kadist, Paris in November 2018, where he worked on his ongoing project Les nucléaires et les choses (2019). Les nucléaires et les choses consists of multi-channel film installation and a photo series, documenting the fallout of the 2011 catastrophe on the town of Futaba in Fukushima Prefecture, which was designated a "Difficult-to-Return" zone due to the nuclear disaster at the Fukushima Daiichi Power Plant. Due to the nuclear radiation, the contents of the Futaba Town Museum of History and Folklore were removed from the area and stored in a different location, and it was unknown if the objects would ever be returned to the area or if another institution would be given responsibility for preserving them. For this artwork, Fujii organized a symposium in the nearby town of Iwaki, inviting the museum curators from the Futaba Town Museum of History and Folklore as well as curators from the Hiroshima Peace Museum and National Museum of Modern Art Tokyo (MOT), as well as anthropologists, archaeologists, philosophers and political scientists to discuss the future of the local museum. The end result was a multi-channel video installation documenting this discussion between art world and cultural specialists and curators, televising a conversation that would normally be held out of the public eye. The installation was juxtaposed with a somber photo series depicting the devastation of Futaba and the profound emptiness of the town after its abandonment in 2011.

Of this project, Fujii has stated that the "disaster opened up multiple, vast streams of time," that he felt were necessary to access as an artist engaging with the problems of collection and the passing of history to future generations, as well as the historical flow of time that led to the "nuclear disaster complex" being situated in Tōhoku in the first place.

== Exhibition history ==
- 2011 - "Film Festival for Creating Our Own Media," Yamaguchi Center for Arts and Media, Yamaguchi, Japan
- 2014 - "Japan Syndrome – Art and Politics after Fukushima," HAU Hebbel am Ufer, Berlin, Germany
- 2015 - “"Recording in Progress, Archives Exhibition and Screenings: the center for remembering 3.11,” Sendai Mediatheque, Sendai, Japan
- 2015 - "After the Symposium," Tokyo Metropolitan Museum, Tokyo, Japan
- 2015 - “Aomori City Archives Exhibition: The construction of history is dedicated to the memories of the unnamed,” Aomori Contemporary Art Centre, Aomori, Japan
- 2016 - "Roppongi Crossing: My Body, Your Voice," Mori Art Museum, Tokyo, Japan
- 2016 - “MOT Annual 2016: Loose Lips Save Ships,” Museum of Contemporary Art Tokyo, Japan
- 2018 - "Fast Forward Festival 5," Onassis Cultural Center, Athens, Greece
- 2018 - "The Primary Fact," ISCP, New York, USA (Solo Exhibition)
- 2018 - "Catastrophe and the Power of Art," Mori Art Museum, Tokyo, Japan
- 2018 - "How little you know about me," National Museum of Modern and Contemporary Art, Korea, Seoul
- 2019 - "The Breathing of Maps," Yamaguchi Center for Arts and Media, Yamaguchi, Japan
- 2019 - "Zero Gravity World," Seoul Museum of Art, Seoul, South Korea
- 2019 - "Contour Biennale 9," Mechelen, Belgium, Germany
- 2019 - "Aichi Triennale 2019: Taming Y/Our Passion," Nagoya City Art Museum, Nagoya, Japan
- 2019 - "Les nucléaires et les choses," KADIST, Paris (Solo Exhibition)
- 2020 - "Thank You Memory: From Cidre to Contemporary Art," Hirosaki Museum of Contemporary Art, Aomori
- 2020 - "Things Entangling," Kadist, Paris, France x Museum of Contemporary Art Tokyo, Japan (online exhibition due to COVID-19)
- 2021 - "Artists and the Disaster: Imagining in the 10th Year," Contemporary Art Gallery Art Tower Mito, Tokyo, Japan
- 2021 - "Special Exhibition Hikaru Fujii: Record of Bombing," Maruki Gallery For The Hiroshima Panels, Saitama, Japan (Solo Exhibition)
- 2021 - "Art 5 – KUNST UND DEMOKRATIE," Platform München, Germany

== Awards ==
- 2017 Nissan Art Award, Grand Prix
- 2020 Tokyo Contemporary Art Award

== See also ==
- Chikako Yamashiro
- Meiro Koizumi
- Koki Tanaka
- Kato Tsubasa
- Dokuyama Bontarō
- Kyun-Chome
- Chim Pom
- Oh Haji
