= Kyun-Chome =

Japanese artist unit

Kyun-Chome (キュンチョメ) is a Japanese artist unit based in Tokyo, made up of Nabuchi (ナブチ, b. 1984, Mito) and Honma Eri (ホンマエリ, b. 1987, Yokohama). They emerged as an art unit after the 2011 Great East Japan Earthquake, and rose to prominence after winning the 17th Taro Okamoto Art Award in 2014.

Kyun-Chome primarily creates video installations, conducting mid- to long-term residencies in socially divided regions to highlight what they have referred to as the "core reality" of a particular place or issue. They have engaged with a broad range of socio-political issues in Japan and abroad, such as natural and manmade disaster, immigration, national history, and gender identity. According to the artists, their work aims to blur the boundaries between perpetrator and victim, creating new associations between tragedy, comedy, and modern faith.

== Education and background ==
Honma and Nabuchi graduated from Sokei Academy of Fine Art & Design located in Ikebukuro, Tokyo in 2009. Nabuchi studied at the alternative art school Bigakkō, completing the "Genius High School" contemporary art seminar taught by Ryūta Ushiro, a member of the artist collective Chim↑Pom.

Honma and Nabuchi began working together in 2011 after the Great East Japan Earthquake. The disaster triggered Honma to quit her job as a salaried employee and pull Nabuchi out of an extended period of time as a hikikomori. In an interview conducted as part of their Art Action UK residency in 2016, Kyun-Chome stated that they recognized that by working together they could go beyond their own individual limitations and create something more potent and powerful.

The name "Kyun-Chome" brings together two Japanese onomatopoeia: kyun kyun which refers to the skipping of a beating heart; and chome chome, which can be used as the oral reading of "XX" for redacted or explicit words, as well as a euphemism for sex. The artists claim that there is not enough kyun kyun and chome chome in the world, so they are working to increase both through their artwork.

== Artworks ==
Kyun-Chome has been attributed as part of a wave of socially conscious young artists in Japan whose activities are not restricted to traditional art spaces such as museums and galleries, but rather engage in collaborative, open-ended, dialogical projects that include participatory elements as central to their practice. Many of these artists engage with starkly political themes that emerged in Japan following the 2011 triple disaster.

Kyun-Chome uses repetitive dialogue and actions in their video projects to explore the inner side of human beings that is hidden underneath the surface. Since 2011, they have created artworks that engage with local communities in such places as Ishinomaki, Okinawa, Hong Kong, and Berlin. While their projects are often critical in nature, they refrain from making overt ethical judgments and instead present the varied feelings and expressions of those who participate in their projects without betraying their own opinions or informing audiences what to think. In the artists' own words, "[W]e can become bound by specific information...However, we are interested in the issues behind those obvious moral messages. We are interested in the hidden aspects of human actions; the way we live, the beliefs we hold onto and the way our emotions sway from one side to another." The artists avoid assigning specific roles in their work together; instead they "rapidly throw ideas at each other," keeping a general idea of what they'd like the project to be like, and working spontaneously toward their goal.

=== Flower XX (2012) ===
The artists' installation Flower XX (2012) consisted of a flowerbed planted directly in the pathway of the exhibition, requiring audiences (including the victims of the disaster) to step on the living flowers in order to enter the exhibition space. At the end of the vibrant orange and yellow flowerbed there was a sign that read, "It feels like everyday we are stepping on something like a flower." Flower XX was described in Asahi Shimbun as "an impressive work that makes one look at the nature of human beings."

=== Flow in Red (2014) ===
Kyun-Chome was awarded the 17th Taro Okamoto Art Prize for their work Flow in Red (2014), an installation they created for the 17th Taro Okamoto Award for Contemporary Art Exhibition. The piece was centered on one ton of rice painted red and molded into a monumental cone, presented as a metaphor for food contaminated with radioactivity after the Fukushima nuclear disaster. This award led to the artists' 2015 solo exhibition at the Taro Okamoto Memorial Museum in Tokyo.

Flow in Red consisted of a "cubicle" with three walls and an open ceiling and an entrance that was obstructed by yellow caution tape that warned visitors not to enter in both English and Japanese. However, inside the space there was a sack of rice bearing an inscription that invited visitors to "please trespass into the no-entry zone," a direct reference to the exclusion zone in Fukushima. The floor of the cubicle was covered in rice, and at its center was a mountain of bright red rice, piled up into a towering cone with a human arm and fist clutching more yellow caution tape at its very top. Seen from above, the red cone in the rectangular white cubicle formed a perfect hinomaru, or Japanese flag.

Kyun-Chome screened two videoworks on the walls beside the mountain of red rice; in order to view them visitors would have to "trespass" into the pseudo-exclusion zone, and step on rice (already a taboo in Japan) that was potentially radioactive. In the first video, Toll the New Year's Bell, Inside the Prohibition, Kyuun-Chome can be witnessed entering the real exclusion zone in Fukushima to ring the bell of a temple in the area on New Year's Eve in 2013. New Japan Paradise, the second video shows the artists in New Year's Eve one year earlier in 2012, also entering the exclusion zone in Fukushima and covertly spray painting decontamination bags with blue circles that are inverted using a negative filter on a smartphone camera to eerily reveal the red hinomaru of Japan's flag on each bag.

Flow in Red can be understood as a commentary on the rice discrimination against Fukushima that proliferated following the disaster, as well as a critical evaluation of the nation's amnesia and policies of avoidance towards the disaster only a few years after it happened. The artists sourced the rice used in the work from eBay, where many farmers from Fukushima had been forced to sell rice that was deemed unfit for human consumption.

=== Rhythm of Survive (2015) ===
In 2015, Kyun-Chome produced a videowork in which they asked people they encountered on the street to jump-rope with a rope that had been previously used in a suicide attempt in the Aokigahara forest (also known as Jukai, or the Sea of Trees (樹海). This artwork has been described as "disquieting," as it comments on the fragility of life through evocation of both childhood and mortality.

=== Making a Perfect Donut (2019) ===
From 2017 to 2018, Kyun-Chome worked with the Okinawan community to create the documentary art film Making a Perfect Donut (2019) about the continued presence and expansion of U.S. military bases in Okinawa. In the film, the artists conduct 10 conversation style interviews with people living in Okinawa, introducing their idea to combine an American donut with an Okinawan sata andagi, in order to make a perfect, "hole-less" donut that can be connected through a hole in the fence of the military base. Posed to a variety of locals with differing stakes in the American military base occupation, Kyun-Chome's absurd idea is greeted with a mixture of responses, ultimately showing how complex and contested the issue is.

Since the film's debut, the artists have been working with Okinawan curator Iharada Haruka in an exhibition series called SCREENINGS: Throw the Perfect Donut Far Away that showcases the film in various venues and film festivals as a way to create dialogue about the political situation in Okinawa. In 2019, Kyun-Chome screened the film at the Maruki Gallery for the Hiroshima Panels and held a three-day special exhibition program entitled Peace Learning Tour: Love & Guns. Kyun-Chome also exhibited the film at 3331 Art Fair at Arts Chiyoda in 2019, where they also exhibited a replica of the "perfect donut."

In September 2020, Making a Perfect Donut was included in "Deep South – Deep South Movie Matchmaking: Celebration of Okinawa and Thai Deep South Filmmakers," an online film festival that introduced films from Thailand and Okinawa to find points of relation between the regions and foster cultural exchange.

=== I am Sage (2019) and Until My Voice Dies (2019) ===
For the 2019 Aichi Triennale, Kyun-Chome responded to the theme "Taming Y/Our Passion" with the videoworks Until My Voice Dies (2019) and I am Sage (2019), in which they engaged with transgender and nonbinary individuals who are undergoing gender transition. The piece documents individuals who were changing their names as part of this complex process, and records them writing their new, chosen name in calligraphy over their given name, and repeatedly shouting their chosen name until they lose their voice.

The artists stated in an interview that they decided to work with transgender and nonbinary people in response to the Aichi Triennale's commission to include an equal number of women and men artists. Honma stated: "It's an approach that highlights the binary genders. When the Aichi organisers said they'd reached gender equality, I knew that they hadn't asked every participant the gender they identify with (although later we also heard that Kyun-Chome was not in the gender count because we are a group)."

In 2019, following the closure of the "After 'Freedom of Expression?'" (in Japanese,『「表現の不自由展」その後」』) exhibition at the Aichi Triennale, Kyun-Chome took an active role in the artist collective ReFreedom_Aichi that aimed to resist the cancellation of the exhibit.

== Exhibitions ==
Kyun-Chome debuted their work in 2012 in the group show Coming Out!!!!!!!! at Nao Nakamura, an alternative gallery space founded in the Kōenji neighborhood of Tokyo by Bigakkō student Nao Nakamura. They have held solo exhibitions at Kunstquartier Bethanien, Berlin in 2015; Deptford X, London in 2016; and Komagome Soko, Tokyo in 2016.

They have been part of numerous group exhibitions outside of Japan, including Taiwan, South Korea, Thailand, the US, Ireland, Denmark, the UK, and France. Other major group exhibitions include their participation in Reborn-Art Festival in 2017 (Oshika Peninsula); the Gangwon International Biennale in 2018 (Gangwon Province); and the Aichi Triennale in 2019 (Aichi Prefecture). They regularly exhibit with a fellow Bigakkō graduate, artist Bontarō Dokuyama.

== Awards ==
- 17th Taro Okamoto Art Award (2014)

== See also ==
- Chim↑Pom
- Bontarō Dokuyama
- Hikaru Fujii
- Kato Tsubasa
- Koki Tanaka
