= Ko Young-hoon =

South Korean painter (born 1952)

- Born: 1952 (age 73–74); Jeju Island, South Korea
- Education: Hongik University

Korean name
- Hangul: 고영훈
- RR: Go Yeonghun
- MR: Ko Yŏnghun

Ko Young-Hoon (born 1952) is a South Korean painter.

== Biography ==
Ko was born in 1952, on Jeju Island, and graduated from Hongik University. He studied Western painting at Hongik University in Seoul, earning a BFA in the Department of Painting in 1976 and an MFA from the same department in 1982, and he later held a teaching post at Hongik University. His first solo exhibition took place in 1976 at Daeho Dabang in Jeju. He lives and works in Seoul. His work is known for its hyperrealism that invokes trompe-l'œil. He is widely recognized as one of the most influential figures in contemporary Korean painting. Since the 1970s, he has developed a distinctive visual language that combines exceptional technical mastery with profound philosophical inquiry. Working with everyday objects such as stones, books, newspapers and white porcelain vessels, Ko has pursued an enduring investigation into perception, illusion and the nature of existence. His work has been exhibited extensively at major museums and institutions in Korea and internationally, as well as in a plethora of solo and group exhibitions, and is represented in numerous public and private collections.

== Art ==
By representing objects with their most minute details, Ko, in the line of Magritte, questions our beliefs of authenticity and objectivity. But if his work clearly draws on Western influences, it is also the product of an almost mystical reflection on traditional Korean aesthetic values and on the concepts of nothingness (mu 無) and existence (yu 有).

His work can be considered pertaining to both Hyperrealism and Surrealism. The critic Gérard Xuriguera says of his series Stonebook: "Combining in his painting lettered messages and their relation to stones, he positions them within the pages of an open book or imposed on newspapers, strangely gravity-free, in a way that creates contrasts in tension, modifying the sense of the displaced objects. This creates a sort of wakened dream, never broken from natural ebbs, in which reality and illusion combine."

== Selected art exhibitions ==
- Solo exhibitions at Total Art Museum and Gana Art Center, Seoul
- 42nd Venice Biennale (1986)
- Public collections, including the National Museum of Contemporary Art and the Ho-Am Art Museum, South Korea
- Detroit Institute of Arts
- Musée de Luneville, France
- Queen Beatrix Collection, Amsterdam
- Yokohama Business Park, Japan
- Three of his works were recently displayed in the Paris group show exhibition "Vide et Plein", displaying the work of 10 Asian artists, organized by Paris-based Maison Bleu Studio.
