= Tenmyouya Hisashi =

Japanese artist

- 天明屋尚
- Born: February 10, 1966 (age 60); Saitama prefecture, Greater Tokyo Area, Japan
- Known for: Contemporary art
- Movement: neo-Nihonga, basara

Tenmyouya Hisashi (天明屋尚, born 1966) is a Japanese contemporary artist, known for developing the styles neo-Nihonga and basara. His work combines traditional Japanese painting techniques with modern influences.

== Biography ==
Tenmyouya was born in Tokyo, Japan in 1966. After working as an art director at a record company, he became a full-time artist in 1997. His practice has since developed around the adaptation of pre-modern Japanese painting traditions into contemporary formats.

== Artistic approaches ==
In the early 2000s, Tenmyouya introduced the term Neo-Nihonga (new Japanese-style painting) to describe his work using traditional Japanese pigments and supports. The style was framed in contrast to Western-influenced oil painting and positioned as a continue of Japanese pictorial traditions in a contemporary setting.

Around 2010, Tenmyouya began describing another stylistic approach called basara, referencing a medieval Japanese term associated with extravagance and excess. The term basara refers to the family of innovative, unprecedented beauty of the Nanboku dynasty period, the Kabukimono of the end of the Warring States period, the Ukiy-o-eshi of the end of the Edo period, and contemporary Japanese youth culture with kitsch tastes. Tenmyouya regards the concept as standing on the opposite end of the spectrum from wabi-sabi and being incompatible with Otaku culture.

== Influences ==
Temyouya has cited artists including Tarō Okamoto as influences, particularly Okamoto's distinction between "Yayoi-like" refined artand Jomon-like dynamic art. The term basara is an adopted and developed version of Okamoto's concept of Jomon-like art, which is excessive in beauty yet innovative.

== Personal life ==
As of 2015, Tenmyouya lives and works in Saitama, Japan and is represented by the Mizuma Art Gallery in Tokyo.

== Selected exhibitions ==
Tenmyouya's work has been presented in numerous exhibitions in Japan and internationally. Notable solo presentations include:

- "Japanese Spirit" at Harajuku Gallery, Tokyo, Japan, 2000
- "Kabuku" at Mizuma Art Gallery, Tokyo, 2003
- "NEO Japanese Paintings" at Roppongi Hills Art and Design Space, Tokyo, 2007
- "Fighting Spirit" at Mizuma Art Gallery, Tokyo, 2008
- "FURYU – EXTRAVAGANT" at Mizuma Art Gallery, Tokyo, 2009
- "G-tokyo 2011" at Mori Arts Center Gallery, Tokyo, 2011
- "Rhyme" at Mizuma Art Gallery, Tokyo, 2012
- "Rough Sketch and Print" at Tengai Gallery, Tokyo, 2013
- "Process through to the original – Sketch" at Roppongi Hills Art and Design Gallery, Tokyo, 2014
- "Rhyme II" at Mizuma Art Gallery, Tokyo, 2014
- "Ippitsu-Nyuukon Exhibition" at Parco Museum, Tokyo, 2014

He has also participated in major group exhibitions such as:

- "One Planet under a Groove: Hip Hop and Contemporary Art", including Bronx Museum of the Arts, Walker Art Center, Museum Viilla Stuck, 2001–02
- "6th Exhibition of the Taro Okamoto Memorial Award for Contemporary Art", Taro Okamoto Museum of Art, Kawasaki (Kanagawa, Japan), 2003
- "The American Effect – Global Perspectives on the United States, 1990–2003", Whitney Museum of American Art, New York City, 2003
- "Japan: Rising", Palm Beach Institute of Contemporary Art, Palm Beach, U.S., 2003
- "GUNDAM, Generating Futures", including Suntory Museum, Ueno Royal Museum, Kawara Museum, 2004
- "MOT Annual" Museum of Contemporary Art Tokyo, 2006
- "Berlin – Tokyo", Neue Nationalgalerie (Berlin, Germany), 2006
- 17th Biennale of Sydney, Sydney, 2010
- "BASARA" at the Spiral Garden, Tokyo, 2010
- "TDW-ART JALAPAGOSU Exhibition" at the Meiji Jingu Gaien, Tokyo, 2010
- "SugiPOP!" at the Portsmouth Museum of Art, Portsmouth, U.S., 2010
- "Bye Bye Kitty!!! Between Heaven and Hell in Contemporary Japanese Art" at Japan Society, New York City, 2011
- "ZIPANG", Nihonbashi Takashimaya (Tokyo), Osaka Takashimaya (Osaka, Japan), Kyoto Takashimaya (Kyoto, Japan), The Niigata Bandaijima Art Museum (Niigata, Japan), Talasaki Museum of Art (Gunma, Japan), 2011
- "Taguchi Art Collection GLOBAL NEW ART", Sompo Japan Museum of Art, Tokyo, 2011
- "TDW-ART ITO JAKUCHU INSPIRED", Meiji Jingu Gaien, Tokyo, 2012
- "Garden of Unearthly Delights: Works by Ikeda, Tenmyouya & teamlab", Japan Society, New York City, 2014
- "Winners of the Taro Okamoto Award for Contemporary Art" Taro Okamoto Museum of Art, Kanagawa, Japan, 2014

== Reception ==
Tenmyouya has received several awards, including the 'Outstanding Perofrmance Award' in 6th Taro Okamoto Award for Contemporary Art in 2003. His works are held in public collections such as the Museum of Fine Arts, Houston, and the Chazen Museum of Art (Madison, Wisconsin), as well as in Japanese museum and private collections.

== Books ==
- Tenmyouya Hisashi, Japanese Spirit (art catalog). Gakken, 2003
- Tenmyouya Hisashi, Kabuki-mono (art catalog). Parco, 2004
- Tenmyouya Hisashi, Tenmyouya Hisashi (art catalog). Kawade Shobō Shinsha, 2006
- Tenmyouya Hisashi, Kamon Tenmyouya Hisashi (art catalog). King of Mountain, 2007
- Tenmyouya Hisashi, Basara Japanese Art Theory Crossing Borders: From Jomon Pottery to Decorated Trucks. Bijutsu Shuppan-sha, 2010.
- Tenmyouya Hisashi, Masterpiece (art catalog). Seigenshiya, Publishers, 2014.
