= Taro Okamoto Award =

Japanese award

The Taro Okamoto Award for Contemporary Art (TARO Award) is an annual open-call art prize in Japan, honoring artists whose work embodies the challenging and innovative spirit of avant-garde painter and sculptor Taro Okamoto (1911-1996).

== History ==
The award was established in 1997 under the name Taro Okamoto Memorial Contemporary Art Award (岡本太郎記念現代芸術大賞) to commemorate Okamoto's legacy and promote new forms of artistic expression. In 2007, the prize was renamed to its current title. Its founding vision asks: "who creates the age?" (Japanese: 時代を創造する者は誰か), a phrase drawn from Okamoto's 1954 book The Art of Today, which carried the subtitle "Who truly creates the age?".

== Structure ==
The competition is an open submission exhibition (公募展), accepting creators across all ages, disciplines, and nationalities. Entrants submit works to a preliminary review, after which selected pieces are exhibited at the Taro Okamoto Museum of Art in Kawasaki. During the exhibition, the final prizes are awarded. Artists are responsible for production and transportation costs of their works.

The panel of jurors changes regularly and has included prominent artists, curators, and critics active in contemporary Japanese art.

The prize is currently divided into several categories. The Taro Okamoto Prize (岡本太郎賞) functions as the grand prize and is presented to a single artis. The Toshiko Okamoto Prize (岡本敏子賞), named after Okamoto's partner and longtime collaborator Toshiko Okamoto. In addition, several Special Prizes (特別賞) are conferred. The competition places no restrictions on artistic medium, and recipients have included painters, sculptors, installation artists, and performance artists.

== Notable recipients ==
- Onishi Yasuaki — TARO Award (grand prize), 10th (FY2006)
- KOSUGE1-16 — TARO Award (grand prize), 11th (FY2007)
- Kyun-Chome — TARO Award (grand prize), 17th (FY2013)
- Akira Yamaguchi — Outstanding Performance Award, 4th (FY2000)
- Hisashi Tenmyouya — Outstanding Performance Award, 6th (FY2002)

== See also ==
- Taro Okamoto
- Taro Okamoto Museum of Art
