= Huang Xin (artist) =

- 黄鑫
- Born: Shandong, China
- Known for: photographic art

Huang Xin (黄鑫) is a Chinese artist and photographer based in Shandong. He recently came to attention following his participation in Paris exhibition Vide et Plein.

== Biography ==
Huang was born in Shandong, China. French art critic Gérard Xuriguera said of his work : "Rothko and Malevitch seem at times to reappear here, but they are but a jumping-off point for a philosophy simultaneously rational and wandering." His friend Liu Bolin said of his work : "At the same time that he says nothing, he says everything," referencing Taoist philosophy. - Liu Bolin

== Solo exhibitions ==
- “川贵行” Shandong Centre Of Art & Design

== Group exhibitions ==
- Vide et Plein (exhibition showing works of 10 Asian artists organized by Paris-based association Maison Bleu Studio)
