= Okinawa Prefectural University of Arts =

Art school in Naha, Japan

- 沖縄県立芸術大学
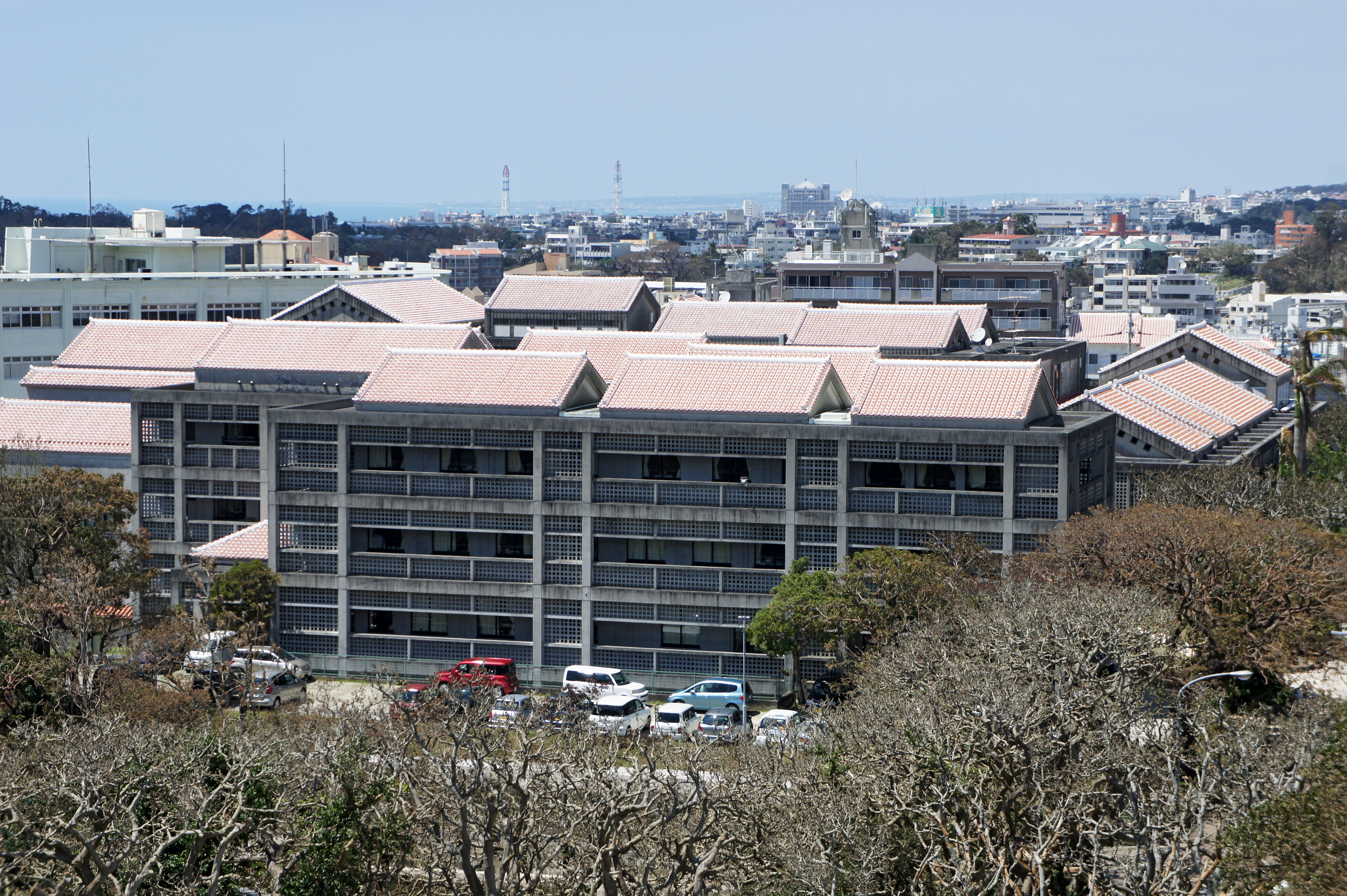
- Main campus
- Type: Public university
- Established: April 1, 1986
- Students: 603
- Location: Naha, Okinawa Prefecture, Japan; 26.2188°N 127.7195°E
- Website: www.okigei.ac.jp/english/

Okinawa Prefectural University of Arts (沖縄県立芸術大学, Okinawa Kenritsu Geijutsu Daigaku) is a public university of arts in Naha, Okinawa Prefecture, Japan. It was established on 1 April 1986.

The university has the Faculty of Arts and Crafts and the Faculty of Music. Its graduate schools are the Graduate School of Formative Arts, the Graduate School of Music Arts, and the Graduate School of Cultural Arts Studies.

== History ==
Planning for the university began in 1982, when a preparatory office was established within the Okinawa Prefectural Government. The establishment of the university was approved by Japan's Minister of Education on 25 December 1985, and the university opened on 1 April 1986.

The university initially had the Faculty of Arts and Crafts. The Faculty of Music opened in 1990. The Graduate School of Formative Arts was established in 1993, followed by the Graduate School of Music Arts in 1994 and the doctoral-level Graduate School of Cultural Arts Studies in 1996.

On 1 April 2021, the university became the Public University Corporation Okinawa Prefectural University of Arts.

== Academics ==
The Faculty of Arts and Crafts offers programs in painting, sculpture, art studies, design, and crafts.

The Faculty of Music offers programs in Western classical music, musicology, Okinawan culture and arts management, and Ryukyuan performing arts.

The Department of Music includes a Ryukyuan Performing Arts Major, with courses in Ryukyuan classical music and Ryukyuan dance and Kumi odori.

A 2013 report by the National Institution for Academic Degrees and University Evaluation listed the Ryukyuan performing arts program among examples of good practice at the university.

As of 1 May 2026, the university had 603 students.

== Campuses and facilities ==
The university has three campuses in the Shuri district of Naha: Shuri-Tonokura, Shuri-Kinjo, and Shuri-Sakiyama.

Its facilities include the University Library and Arts Museum, the Research Institute, and the Sōgakudō Concert Hall. The Sōgakudō Concert Hall has a 390-seat auditorium, rehearsal rooms, classrooms, and a recording studio.

== Cultural heritage ==
The University Library and Arts Museum holds materials relating to Okinawan and Ryukyuan culture. Its collections include the Yoshitaro Kamakura Collection, which the university describes as a resource concerning Okinawan cultural assets lost in the Second World War.

The collection includes photographs, research notebooks, bingata materials, ceramics, and historical documents related to Ryukyuan art. The Ryukyu Art Survey Photographs taken by Yoshitaro Kamakura were designated an Important Cultural Property of Japan in 2005.

The university is located in the Shuri district of Naha, near Shuri Castle. In 2022, it signed a cooperation agreement with the Okinawa General Bureau, Okinawa Prefecture, and the Okinawa Churashima Foundation on technical succession and human-resource development for the restoration of Shuri Castle.

== International exchange ==
As of 2025, the university had academic exchange agreements with twelve institutions in seven countries and regions.

The university has had an exchange agreement with the Indonesian Institute of the Arts Bali, formerly the Indonesian Institute of the Arts Denpasar, since 2012. In 2024, the two institutions signed a memorandum of understanding at the Shuri-Tonokura Campus in Naha.

== See also ==
- Ryukyuan music
- Ryukyuan dance
- Kumi odori
- Shuri Castle
