= Chikako Yamashiro =

Japanese filmmaker (born 1976)

- Born: 1976 (age 49–50); Okinawa, Japan
- Education: Okinawa Prefectural University of Arts; Surrey Institute of Art & Design, University College
- Occupations: Film maker and video artist

Chikako Yamashiro (山城 知佳子, Yamashiro Chikako; born 1976) is a Japanese filmmaker and video artist. Her works in photography, video and performance create visual investigations into the history, politics and culture of her homeland Okinawa. Particularly salient are themes related to the terrible civilian casualties incurred in Okinawa during World War II and the on-going troubles and hardships caused by the U.S. military presence in Okinawa. Since 2019 she is associate professor at the Tokyo University of the Arts.

Yamashiro has received various awards including the Kurashiki Contemporary Art Biennale (2005), the Asian Art Award (2017), the Zonta prize at the International Short Film Festival Oberhausen (2018), the Asian Art Asia Pacific Breweries Foundation Signature Art Prize (2018), and most recently, the Tokyo Contemporary Art Award (2020-2022). She has also participated in the Okinawa Artist's Exchange Residence Program in the Philippines (2011).

== Early life ==
Yamashiro was born in 1976 in Naha and raised in Okinawa. She received a bachelor's degree in oil painting at the Okinawa Prefectural University of Arts in 1999. In 2000, she attended a fellowship at the Surrey Institute of Art & Design (presently University for the Creative Arts) in the UK. She obtained her master's degree in Environmental Design from the Graduate School of Formative Arts at the Okinawa Prefectural University of Arts in 2002.

== Career ==
=== Early Performance Works ===
As an undergraduate student Yamashiro studied oil painting and experimented with installations that she created along various shores in Okinawa. During this time Yamashiro began to feel that these art practices were not compatible with her identity as Okinawan; her search for authentic Okinawan art led her towards primitive spiritual structures on the islands and the rituals performed at these places. She eventually landed on the subject of Okinawan tombs and graveyards after her trip to the Aran Islands where she felt the resilience of Celtic language and beliefs and the remains of ancient ruins had equivalents in her homeland.

Upon her return to Okinawa, Yamashiro used tombs and graveyards as sites for her early performance work including Okinawa Graveyard Club (2004), a video in which Yamashiro dons white tennis attire and dances emphatically in front of a grave for 6 minutes and Graveyard Series (2004-2007), photographs documenting Yamashiro's playful interventions at graves, utaki, and other sacred space. She attributes the comical and spirited nature of these works as a celebration of Okinawa's “rich outlook on life and death,” and the performances' location of a gravesite specifically chosen because of practices such as maintaining gardens for the deceased and greeting ancestors by sharing a meal at the grave known as seimeisai (siimii in local dialect). Art History professor Keiko Asanuma argues that these performances can also be viewed as an early sign of Yamashiro's interest in the concept of borders — the grave site acting as a border between life and death and the location offering an opportunity to obscure those demarcations.

Yamashiro expanded on the geo-political nature that applies to the notion of divided spaces in Okinawa for her video BORDER (2003) in which she walks along the fenced edge between US and Okinawan territory. At one point in the video, the camera reveals an Okinawan tomb that had been co-opted into US territory, thereby restricting access and the performance of rituals at the grave site. Since the creation of BORDER onwards, addressing the dynamic between Okinawa and the bases situated within it would become a central theme amongst Yamashiro's work.

==== OKINAWA TOURIST series (2004) ====
Yamashiro exhibited her formative video work OKINAWA TOURIST series (2004) for her debut show as a video and performance artist at Maejima Art Center. The series consists of three 6 to 8 minute long performances: Graveyard Eisa, I Like Okinawa Sweet, and Trip to Japan. Graveyard Eisa and I Like Okinawa Sweet are both filmed in Okinawa, the former shows a dystopian dance troupe performing eisa at a gravesite, and the latter features Yamashiro zealously licking an ice cream in front of a base fence. Trip to Japan takes place in front of the National Diet Building in Tokyo, where Yamashiro mockingly acts as either a representative of Okinawa or local tour guide while holding up an image of an Okinawan tomb.

Yamashiro created the performances in response to representations of Okinawa as an idyllic paradise found in mainstream culture, such as the popular NHK drama Churasun which portrayed Okinawa with mainly blue skies and seas. In the wake of the September 11th attacks, local and national governments were also active in promoting this beautified image of Okinawa in order to reassure Japanese citizens that the islands were still safe to travel to after growing concern that the area, populated by US bases, was a possible target for counterattacks. Borrowing the name from an Okinawan tourism operator for the series title, OKINAWA TOURIST relies on humor and parody to complicate the state's commercialized image and expose the realities of Okinawa. Visual Studies professor Tina Takemoto suggests that the segment I Like Okinawa Sweet takes on a particularly gendered reading of these realities, as the imagery of a young woman (Yamashiro) licking an ice cream within the presence of US soldiers (and a looped soundtrack of an American male voice calling out “Hey there, hey, how ya doin’?”) may conjure up, in local memory, the violence perpetrated by the US forces against Okinawan women and girls.

=== Shore Connivance Shore of Ibano, Urasoe City — Complex.1 — (2007); Seaweed Women (2008) ===
Between 2007 and 2008 Yamashiro created two videos/performances addressing the impact of the bases on the beaches and waters of Okinawa: Shore Connivance Shore of Ibano, Urasoe City — Complex.1 — (2007) and Seaweed Women (2008). Shore Connivance — Shore of Ibano, Urasoe City — Complex.1 — (2007), is set on a beach in Urasoe that was once largely untouched and abundant with wildlife due to its proximity to the bases. In her video, Yamashiro speaks to an anonymous older man who tells her about the beach's history including how local Okinawans capitalized on the ambiguity over the area’s regulating party and effectively reappropriating it as their own meeting grounds, even if just momentarily. The significance of this beach as a liminal space — or in her own words, a “ grey zone” — is underscored by Yamashiro's unconventional use of the word mokunin for the original Japanese title mokunin hama (translated into English as Shore Connivance). This term derives from the word mokunin kosakuchi which was used to describe land taken from Okinawans by US forces that through ongoing negotiations, and what Yamashiro describes as a “guilty conscience” on behalf of the US, Okinawans were tacitly permitted to cultivate the land they once owned. In both the mokunin hama and mokunin kokusakuchi, Yamashiro saw a “grey zone” that was created through the resilience of Okinawans but under constant threat by US military forces.

These borders, and the latent violence built into them, also informed Yamashiro's work Seaweed Women (2008) which was filmed at several waterside locations, including the “mokunin hama” from Shore Connivance and the highly contested bay of Henoko. The video is taken from the perspective of a fictional seaweed woman submerged in the water whose gasps for breath can be heard as she swims along the shore. As Yamashiro crosses the invisible border between US and Okinawa waters, the camera finds traces of the military's omnipresence: an army tank resting on the coral seabed and a boat with Japanese coast guards. The act of crossing into restricted waters to film the scene and the surveillance of Henoko by coast guards allude to recent cases of Japanese coast guards violently restraining posters at sea who were demonstrating against base development in Henoko.

=== Inheritance series (2008-2010) ===
Inheritance series (2008-2010) includes a collection of photographs and the video Your Voice Came Out Through My Throat (2009), which Yamashiro produced while running a workshop at an adult care center in Okinawa. The workshop relied on group reminiscence therapy with the goal of helping Okinawan survivors from World War II speak about their experiences, many of whom were initially reluctant to do so. Over the course of numerous visits workshop participants eventually opened up and shared their memories, including one man who witnessed his immediate family members commit suicide while residing in Saipan. Yamashiro later asked the same man to record his story, which she used within her work Your Voice Came Out Through My Throat. In the video, Yamashiro stands before a white background, the camera closed in tightly around her face as she looks off to the side of the camera. As Yamashiro mouths the story he tells in the footage, a projection of his face is mapped onto hers.

In an interview with Keiko Okamura, curator at the TOP museum, Yamashiro explains her choice to reenact the footage being a consequence of her difficulty sympathising and grasping the participants experiences solely through listening to them speak as well as the impossibility of her visualising their stories when she had no similar experiences. Through the memorization and repeated enactment of retelling the participant's story, Yamashiro felt that she could finally begin to envision and relate to his pain. In virtually embodying the elderly man, Yamashiro lends her own body in the transmission stories from older generations, gradually being lost to time) unto the younger generations, also described as “bodies of memory”. The photographs from this series also involve the corporeal transference of experience and memory, capturing scenes of ‘performances’ in which the elderly members surround Yamashiro, touching and caressing her.

Yamashiro's engagement with historical memory and war narratives became notably more prevalent after the 2007 controversy over the planned erasure of the forced suicides of Okinawan civilians by the Japanese army from history textbooks in Japan. Large demonstrations against the removal were held in Okinawa and the government only partially conceded to the protestors demands, however refused to explicitly criticize or implicate the Japanese Army.

=== Mud Man (2016) ===
Yamashiro's critically acclaimed video work Mud Man (2016), created in cooperation with the Aichi Triennale, follows a non-linear narrative that bridges Okinawa to other parts of Asia through the legacy and trauma of militarism and neo-colonialism in their respective countries. In its single channel format, the video begins with expanses of fields and the earth, hands rising up out from the grass. Men and women covered in mud look up at a birds nest in a tree, from which feces falls, and the sound of dropping feces sends them into a flashback state that takes place in a dark ditch; the ditch then transforms into a battlefield theatre in which the 'mud men' become entrapped spectators watching actual footage taken from the Battle of Okinawa, the Korean War and the War in Vietnam. Juxtaposition of the past and the present is employed throughout the work wherein Yamashiro weaves together contemporary 'war' images, such as protestors demonstrating against base development and shots of underground and underwater passages taken from abandoned US weapon storage facilities in Okinawa. The video finale features hands once again rising out from the earth, however this time they are in a field of white trumpet lilies, and end the work with a crescendoing applause.

The work is unique within Yamashiro's oeuvre as it is one of her only videos that utilizes footage Yamashiro shot outside of Japan. In filming for Mud Man Yamashiro travelled specifically to Gangjeong village in Korea where the Jeju Naval Base, designed to aid US deployment in Asia, was recently completed. Similar to numerous US base developments in Okinawa, the Jeju Naval Base was met with intense local resistance. Yamashiro underscores the link between the two areas through the use of historical war footage of both countries as well as the narration of poems read in Korean, Okinawan Dialect, and Japanese; copies of poems in these three languages were printed in a handout available at the Aichi Triennale exhibition.

Mud Man was well received by both Japanese and international audiences; Yamashiro was awarded the Asian Art Award in 2017 and the Zonta prize at the International Short Film Festival Oberhausen in 2018 for her video.

== Publications and works ==
=== Publications ===
- Chikako Yamashiro. Tokyo: Yumiko Chiba Associates, 2012.
- Asanuma, Keiko (editor). Circulating World: The Art of Chikako Yamashiro. Tokyo: Yumiko Chiba Associates, 2016.

=== Selected works ===
The following works list both their English language and Japanese language titles (if applicable):

- 2003: BORDER
- 2004: Okinawa Graveyard Club (Japanese title: OKINAWA墓庭クラブ)
- 2004: OKINAWA TOURIST series (Japanese title: オキナワ TOURIST シリーズ)
  - Graveyard Eisa (Japanese title: 墓庭エイサー)
  - Trip to Japan (Japanese title: 日本への旅).
  - I like Okinawa Sweet
- 2004-2007: Graveyard series (Japanese title: 墓庭シリーズ)
- 2007: Shore Connivance — Shore of Ibano, Urasoe City — Complex.1 — (Japanese title: 黙認浜 — 浦添市イバノの海 — Complex.1 —)
- 2008: Seaweed Woman (Japanese title: アーサ女)
- 2008-2010: Inheritance series (Japanese title: 継承シリーズ)
- 2009: Your voice came out through my throat (Japanese title: あなたの声は私の喉を通った)
- 2010: Sinking Voices, Red Breath (Japanese title: 沈む声、紅い息)
- 2010; re-edited in 2012: Choros of the Melodies (Japanese title: コロスの唄)
- 2012: A Woman of the Butcher Shop (Japanese title: 肉屋の女)
- 2015: The Beginning of Creation, Abduction / A child (Japanese title: 創造の発端ーアブダクション/子供ー)
- 2016: Mud Man (Japanese title: 土の人)
- 2019: Chinbin Western: Representation of the Family (Japanese title: チンビン·ウェスタン家族の表象)

== Exhibitions ==
Yamashiro's video works and photographs have been exhibited throughout Japan and internationally.

Selected solo exhibitions:

- 2002: Woman at Graveyard (Maejima Art Center, Okinawa)
- 2004: OKINAWA TOURIST (Maejima Art Center, Okinawa)
- 2012: MAM Project 018: Yamashiro Chikako (Mori Art Museum Gallery 1, Tokyo)
- 2016: The Beginning of Creation: Abduction/ A Child (Yumiko Chiba Associates, Tokyo)
- 2017: The Sea of Being (RENEMIA, Okinawa)
- 2018: Shapeshifter (White Rainbow, London)
- 2025: An Evening With Chikako Yamashiro (Museum of Modern Art, New York)

Selected group exhibitions:

- 2008: Okinawa Prismed 1872-2008 (The National Museum of Modern Art, Tokyo)
- 2009: Into the Atomic Sunshine in Okinawa (Okinawa Prefectural Museum & Art Museum)
- 2010: Yebisu International Festival for Art & Alternative Visions: Searching Songs (Tokyo Metropolitan Museum of Photography)
- 2012-13: Women In-Between: Asian Women Artists 1984-2012 (Fukuoka Asian Art Museum and others)
- 2015: East Asia Feminism: FANTasia (Seoul Museum of Art, Seoul/Korea)
- 2015-16: The 8th Asian Pacific Triennial of Contemporary Art (Queensland Art Gallery /Gallery of Modern Art, Brisbane/Australia)
- 2016: Aichi Triennale (the former Meiji-ya Sakae Building, Aichi)
- 2016-17: SEVEN JAPANESE ROOMS (Fondazione Carispezia, La Spezia/Italy)
- 2016-17: From Generation to Generation: Inherited Memory and Contemporary Art (Contemporary Jewish Museum, San Francisco)
- 2018: Asia Pacific Breweries Foundation Signature Art Prize 2018 (National Museum of Singapore)
- 2018: The Special Exhibition of the 70th anniversary of Jeju April 3rd massacre : Post Trauma (Jeju Museum of Art, Korea)
- 2019: Image Narratives: Literature in Japanese Contemporary Art The National Art Center, Tokyo

In 2018, Yamashiro performed the work And I Go through You for the Kyoto International Performing Arts Festival at the Kyoto Art Center.

== Sources ==
Asanuma, Keiko. “Nature motifs in the work of Chikako Yamashiro,” in Circulating World: The Art of Chikako Yamashiro. edited by Keiko Asanuma. Tokyo: Yumiko Chiba Associates, 2016.

Jennison, Rebecca. “Unspeakable Bodies of Memory: Performance and Precarity in Recent Works by Yamashiro Chikako.” In Journal of Kyoto Seika University 44 (2014): 183–200.

Jennsion, Rebecca. “Contact Zones and Liminal Spaces in Okinawan and Zainichi Contemporary Art.” In Asian Diasporic Visual Cultures and the Americas 6 (2020): 11–26.

Ma, Ran. “Okinawan Dream Show: Approaching Okinawa in Moving Image Works into the New Millennium.” In Independent Filmmaking across Borders in Contemporary Asia, 163–198. Amsterdam: Amsterdam University Press, 2020.

Suzuki, Katsuo. “Conflicting spaces: Questions from “mokunin” places.” in Circulating World: The Art of Chikako Yamashiro. edited by Keiko Asanuma. Tokyo: Yumiko Chiba Associates, 2016.

Yamashiro, Chikako and Keiko Okamura. “Chikako Yamashiro: Talking about her own work,” in Circulating World: The Art of Chikako Yamashiro. edited by Keiko Asanuma. Tokyo: Yumiko Chiba Associates, 2016.
