= Maison Bleu Studio =

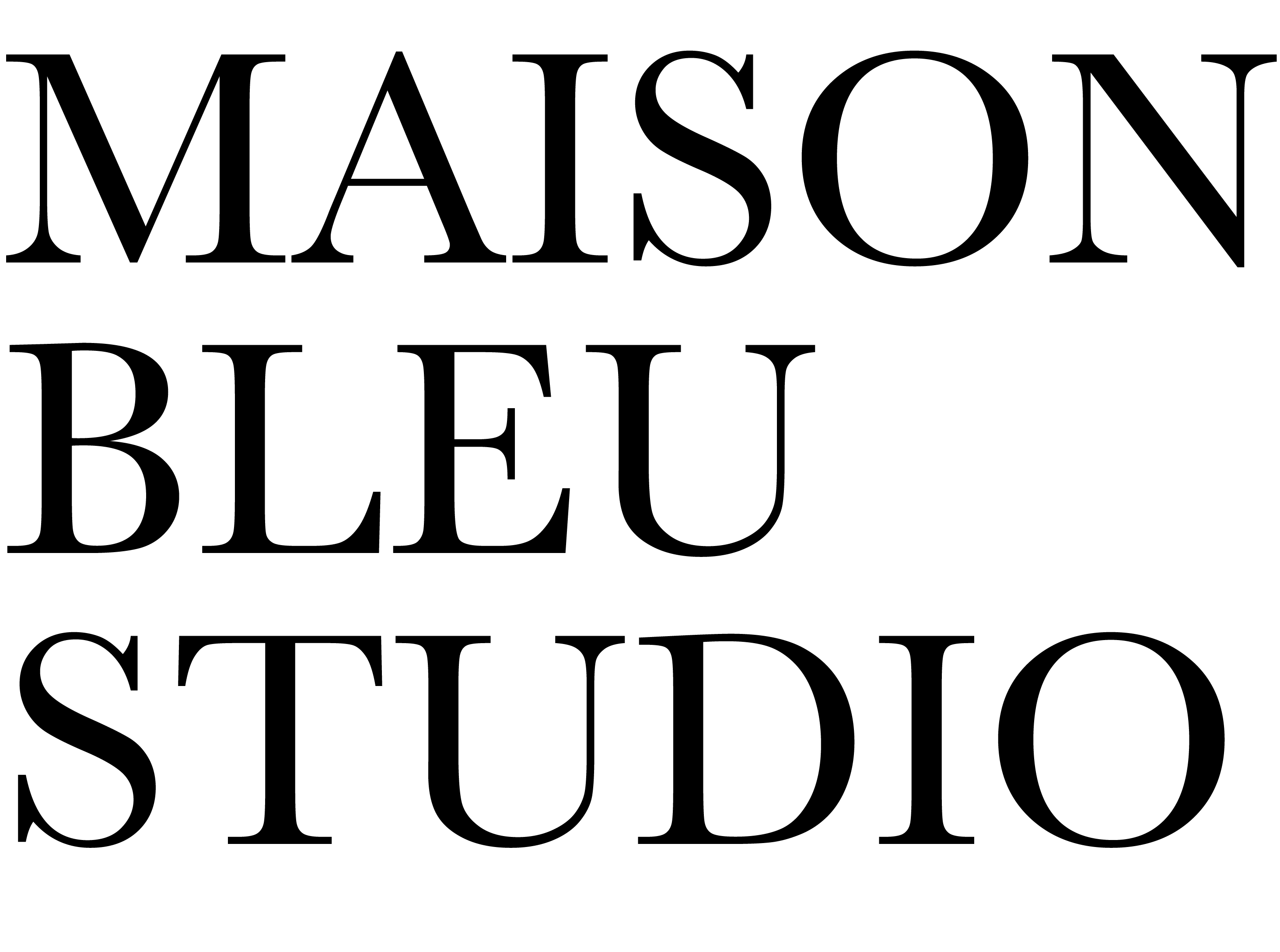
- Established: 2014
- Type: contemporary art
- Director: Claire Myhill and Takeshi Sugiura
- Website: maisonbleustudio.com

Maison Bleu Studio is a Paris-based association for contemporary Asian artists.

Established in 2014 by Claire Myhill and Jiyun Kim, Maison Bleu Studio organises large-scale art exhibitions open to the public.

== The exhibition Vide et Plein ==
The exhibition Vide et Plein, organized by Maison Bleu Studio, took place during the FIAC 2015 (as part of the VIP "hors les murs" of the FIAC), at the Espace Commines in the Marais. Participating artists included Li Chevalier, Ai Weiwei, Onishi Yasuaki, Wang Keping (Chinese: 王克平), Keita Mori, Yun-kyung Jeong, Huang Xin, Lim Hyunjung and Ko Younghoon. "Vide et Plein" (English translation, space and fill) corresponds to a philosophical and artistic concept, the subject of the book "Vide et Plein" by François Cheng. The exhibition was listed in as the top five "trendy events" of the week in Paris. Vide et Plein received 10 thousand visitors over a four-day period.

== Official sponsor ==
Christophe Février of GEO PLC was sponsor of the Exhibition Vide et Plein.

Christophe Février, President of GEO PLC

Christophe Février is also co-director of Flair Films and Flair Production with Guillaume Roy, Laurent Ramamonjiarisoa. Flair Productions produced the film "Vide et Plein", directed by Stéphane Haskell.
