= Onishi Yasuaki =

Japanese artist

- 大西康明
- Born: Osaka, Japan
- Known for: Artist
- Notable work: Reverse of Volume

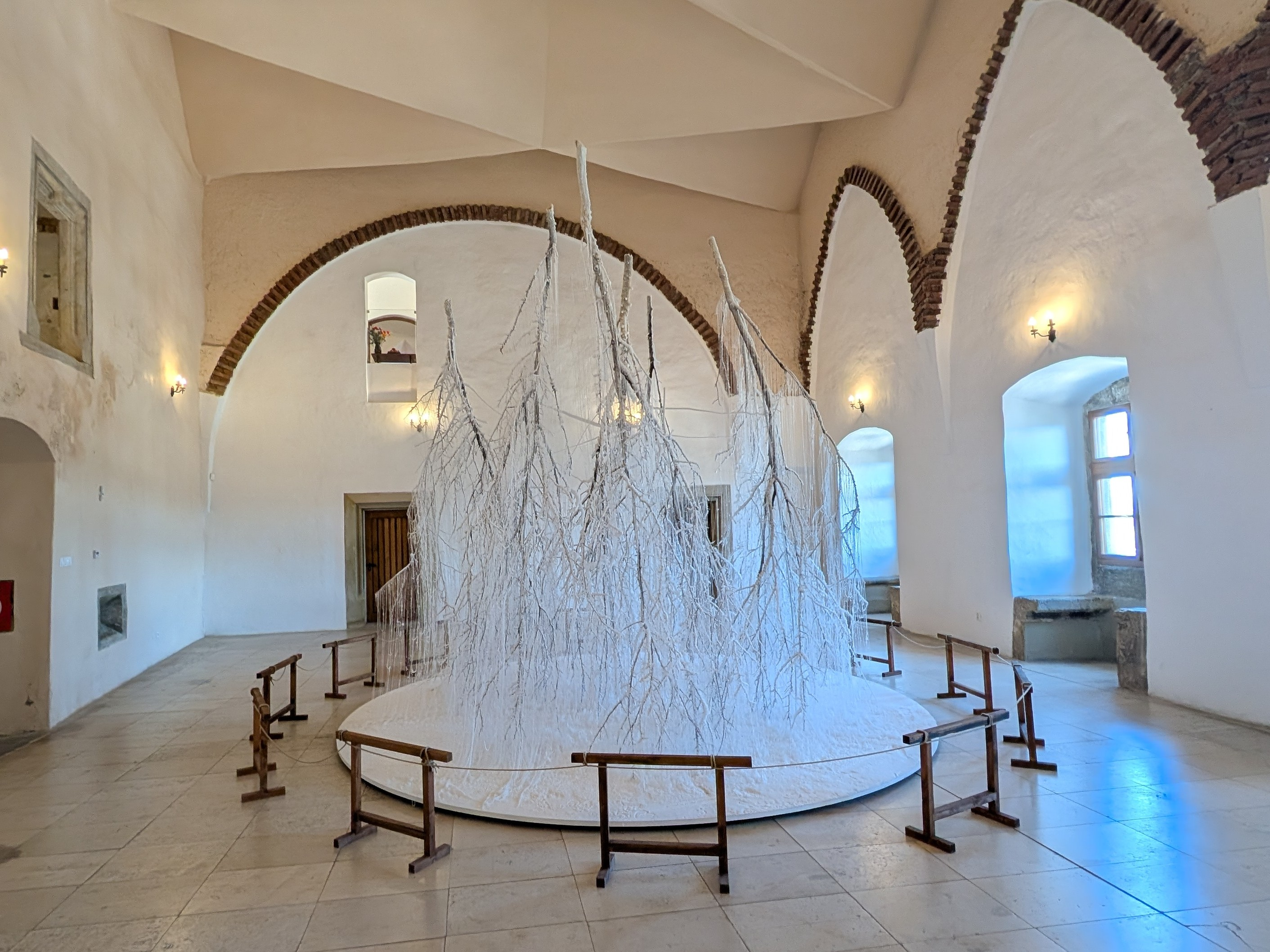
"Crystalized Silence" in Barbora's Palace of Trenčín Castle, 2026

Onishi Yasuaki (大西康明) is a Japanese artist working in the mediums of installation, sculpture, and painting.

== Biography ==
Yasuaki Onishi studied sculpture at University of Tsukuba and Kyoto City University of Arts, Japan. His sculptures are made from a mix of materials, including tree branches, wire, hot glue, and urea.

Yasuaki uses boxes to map out the eventual shape of his piece, draping a sheet of plastic over them. He attaches the plastic sheet from above using strands of glue, until the boxes can safely be removed without much altering the "landscape". In this sense, the process and finished installation look completely different.

His work has been exhibited in solo shows across Japan and abroad, and included in both Ways of Worldmaking in 2011 and National Museum of Art, Osaka.

In 2010, Yasuaki was the recipient of a United States-Japan Foundation Fellowship that included a residency at the Vermont Studio Center, as well as a grant from The Pollock-Krasner Foundation Inc., New York.

His most recent solo exhibition in the United States was in 2012 at the Marlin and Regina Miller Gallery at Kutztown University in Kutztown, Pennsylvania.

His piece "Reverse of Volume" was the central feature in the 2015 annual exhibition "Vide et Plein" of Paris-based Maison Bleu Studio.

In 2016, Yasuaki did a large installation for the Fresh Paint Contemporary Art & Design Fair, Tel-Aviv's largest and most influential annual art event in Israel.

== Prizes ==
- Granship Art Compe, prize, 2014
- Sakuyakonohana prize, 2014
- Pola Art Foundation, 2011
- U.S. Japan Award Fellowship, Vermont Studio Center, 2010
- Pollock-Krasner Foundation, 2010
- Kala Art Institute, fellowship, 2009
- IASK Asia Pacific Artists Fellowship National Museum of Contemporary Art Korea, 2009
- Winner of the Shuo foundation prize, 2007
- Winner of the Amuse Art Jam Kyoto, 2005
- Epson Color Imaging Contest Judge prize, 2003

== Collaboration ==
In a collaboration with Mercedes-Benz, Onishi Yasuaki did a sculptural installation based on the CLA model of Mercedes-Benz, the video Shaping Air was directed by German director Björn Fischer.

== Selected group exhibitions ==
- 2015 Vide et Plein, Maison Bleu Studio, Paris, France
- 2014 in Search of Critical Imagination/Fukuoka Art Museum, Fukuoka, Japan
- 2010 Art Court Frontier #8/Art Court Gallery, Osaka, Japan
- 2009 phantasmagoria/Ieyoung Contemporary Art Museum, Suwon, Korea
- 2009 Changwon Asian Art Festival/Sung-San Art Hall, Changwon, Korea

== Selected solo exhibitions ==
- 2015 reverse of volume, Regional Contemporary Art Fund Centre, France
- 2014 vertical emptiness/Gallery Out of Place, Tokyo, Japan
- 2013 reverse of volume/Joice Gallery, Beijing, China
- 2012 inner space/The Wilfrid Israel Museum of Asian Art and Studies, Hazorea, Israel
- 2012 reverse of volume/Rice Gallery, Houston, USA
- 2011 reverse of volume/Aichi Prefectural Museum, Nagoya, Japan
- 2010 reverse of volume/Vermont Studio Center Red Mill Gallery, Johnson, United States
- 2010 horizontal forest/Not Quite Gallery, Fengersfors, Sweden
- 2010 ridge of boundary/para_Site Gallery, Graz, Austria
- 2010 reverse of volume/Kinokino Centre for Art and Film, Sandnes, Norway
- 2008 mountair/Kongsi, Enschede, Netherlands
- 2008 dairy distance/Solyst Artists in Residence Centre, Jyderup, Denmark
- 2007 inner skin/neutron, Kyoto, Japan
- 2007 vertical clue/Gallery b. Tokyo, Tokyo, Japan
- 2007 space between face and reverse/Pantaloon, Osaka, Japan
- 2006 vertex/neutron, Kyoto, Japan
- 2006 visible/Sfera Exhibition, Kyoto, Japan
- 2005 breath nebula/Inax Gallery 2, Tokyo, Japan
- 2005 clue in the void/Sfera Exhibition, Kyoto, Japan
- 2005 clue in the case/neutron, Kyoto, Japan
- 2005 restriction sight/under public, Osaka, Japan
- 2004 restriction sight/neutron B1 Gallery, Kyoto, Japan
- 2004 see darkness/Gallery b. Tokyo, Tokyo, Japan
- 2003 thing of darkness/Gallery b. Tokyo, Tokyo, Japan
