= Fukushima nuclear accident cleanup =

Decontamination effort after the 2011 Fukushima accident

The Fukushima accident cleanup is an ongoing attempt to limit radioactive contamination from the three nuclear reactors involved in the Fukushima nuclear accident that followed the earthquake and tsunami on 11 March 2011. The affected reactors were adjacent to one another and accident management was made much more difficult because of the number of simultaneous hazards concentrated in a small area. Failure of emergency power following the tsunami resulted in loss of coolant from each reactor, hydrogen explosions damaging the reactor buildings, and water draining from open-air spent fuel pools. Plant workers were put in the position of trying to cope simultaneously with core meltdowns at three reactors and exposed fuel pools at three units.

Automated cooling systems were installed within 3 months from the accident. A fabric cover was built to protect the buildings from storms and heavy rainfall. New detectors were installed at the plant to track emissions of xenon gas which can be a sign of nuclear fission. Filters were installed to reduce contaminants from escaping the area of the plant into the area or atmosphere. Cement has been laid near the seabed to control contaminants from accidentally entering the ocean.

Michio Aoyama, a scientist at Fukushima University's Institute of Environmental Radioactivity, estimated that the meltdowns and explosions released 18,000 terabecquerel (TBq) of caesium 137 (equivalent to roughly 5.6 kilograms or 12 pounds), mostly into the Pacific Ocean. He also estimated that two years after the accident, the stricken plant was still releasing 30 gigabecquerel (30 GBq, or approximately 0.8 curie equivalent to roughly 9 milligrams or 0.14 grains) of caesium 137 and the same amount (in terms of activity, not in terms of mass – the mass of ^{90}Sr amounts to roughly 5.8 milligrams or 0.090 grains) of strontium 90 into the ocean daily. For comparison, the LD50 of Caesium-137 in mice (through acute radiation syndrome) has been reported at 245 μg/kg body weight whereas experiments in the 1970s yielded a lethal dose in dogs of 44 μg/kg body weight. In a 70-kilogram (150 lb) adult human, this would imply doses of 17 milligrams (0.26 gr) and 3 milligrams (0.046 gr) respectively. In September 2013, it was reported that the level of strontium-90 detected in a drainage ditch located near a water storage tank, from which around 300 tons of water was found to have leaked, was believed to have exceeded the threshold set by the government. Efforts to control the flow of contaminated water have included trying to isolate the plant behind a 30-metre-deep (98 ft), 1.5-kilometre-long (0.93 mi) ice wall of frozen soil, which has had limited success.

Decommissioning the plant was estimated to cost tens of billions of dollars in 2013/2014 and last 30 to 40 years. In November 2016, Japan's trade ministry put the cost of the clean up of radioactive contamination and compensation for victims at US$180 billion (20 trillion yen). Tokyo Electric Power Company (TEPCO) is going to remove the remaining nuclear fuel material from the plants. TEPCO completed the removal of 1,535 fuel assemblies from the unit 4 spent fuel pool in December 2014 and 566 fuel assemblies from the unit 3 spent fuel pool in February 2021. TEPCO plans to remove all fuel rods from the spent fuel pools of units 1, 2, 5, and 6 by 2031 and to remove the remaining molten fuel debris from the reactor containments of units 1, 2, and 3 by 2040 or 2050.

While radioactive particles were found to have contaminated rice harvested near Fukushima City in the autumn of 2011, fears of contamination in the soil have receded as government measures to protect the food supply have appeared to be successful. Studies have shown that soil contamination in most areas of Fukushima was not serious. In 2018, it was reported that contaminated water was still flowing into the Pacific Ocean, but at a diminished rate of 2 GBq per day. (Note: This probably means two billion disintegrations per day, and is thus 23 kBq (disintegrations per second) over the whole daily effluent volume of about 200 tons per day.)

== Overview ==
At the time of the initial event, 50 TEPCO employees remained onsite in the immediate aftermath to work to stabilize the plant and begin cleanup.

Initially, TEPCO did not put forward a strategy to regain control of the situation in the reactors. Helmut Hirsch, a German physicist and nuclear expert, said "they are improvising with tools that were not intended for this type of situation". On 17 April 2011, however, TEPCO appeared to put forward the broad basis of a plan that included: (1) reaching "cold shutdown in about six to nine months;" (2) "restoring stable cooling to the reactors and spent fuel pools in about three months;" (3) putting "special covers" on Units 1, 3, and 4 starting in June; (4) installing "additional storage containers for the radioactive water that has been pooling in the turbine basements and outside trenches;" (5) using radio-controlled equipment to clean up the site; and (6) using silt fences to limit ocean contamination. Previously, TEPCO publicly committed to installing new emergency generators 20 m above sea level, twice the height of the generators destroyed by the tsunami on 11 March. Toshiba and Hitachi had both proposed plans for shuttering the facility.

"Cold shutdown" was accomplished on 11 December 2011. From that point active cooling was no longer needed, but water injection was still required due to large water leaks. Long-term plans for Units 5 and 6 have not been announced, "but they too may need to be decommissioned".

On 5 May 2011, workers entered reactor buildings for the first time since the accident. The workers began to install air filtration systems to clean air of radioactive materials to allow additional workers to install water cooling systems.

In 2017, TEPCO announced that remote-controlled robots sent into the destroyed Unit 3 reactor buildings had found the reactor's melted uranium fuel, which had burned through the floor of the reactor vessel and settled in clumps on the concrete floor below.

== Scope of cleanup ==
Japanese reactor maker Toshiba said it could decommission the earthquake-damaged Fukushima nuclear power plant in about 10 years, three times quicker than the American Three Mile Island plant. As a comparison, at Three Mile Island the vessel of the partially melted core was first opened 11 years after the accident, with cleanup activities taking several more years.

TEPCO announced it restored the automated cooling systems in the damaged reactors in about three months, and had the reactors put into cold shutdown status in six months.

First estimates included costs as high as ¥1 trillion (US$13 billion), as cited by the Japanese Prime Minister at the time, Yoshihiko Noda (野田 佳彦). This estimate was made before the scope of the problem was known, however. It seems that the contamination was less than feared. No strontium is detectable in the soil, and though the crops of the year of the disaster were contaminated, the crops produced by the area now are safe for human consumption.

In 2016, Japan's Ministry of Economy, Trade and Industry estimated the total cost of dealing with the Fukushima accident at ¥21.5 trillion (US$187 billion), almost twice the previous estimate of ¥11 trillion (US$96 billion). A rise in compensation for victims of the accident from ¥5.4 trillion (US$47 billion) to ¥7.9 trillion (US$69 billion) was expected, with decontamination costs estimated to rise from ¥2.5 trillion (US$22 billion) to ¥4 trillion (US$35 billion), costs for interim storage of radioactive material to increase from ¥1.1 trillion (US$10 billion) to ¥1.6 trillion (US$14 billion), and costs of decommissioning reactors to increase from ¥2 trillion (US$17 billion) to ¥8 trillion (US$69 billion).

== Working conditions at the plant ==
There has been concern that the plant would be dangerous for workers. Two workers suffered skin burns from radiation, but no serious injuries or fatalities have been documented to have been caused by radiation at Fukushima Dai-ichi.

=== Workers in dorms exposed to radiation ===
Two shelters for people working at the Fukushima site were not listed as part of the radiation management zones although radiation levels in the shelters exceeded the legal limits. The consequence was that the workers did not get paid the extra "danger allowance" that was paid to workers in these "radiation management zones". The shelters were constructed by Toshiba Corporation and the Kajima Corporation at a place some 2 kilometers west of the damaged reactors, just outside the plant compound, but near reactors 1 to 4. The shelters were built after the shelters at the plant compound became overcrowded. At 7 October 2011, radiation levels were between 2 and 16 microsieverts per hour in the Toshiba building, and 2 to 8.5 in the Kajima dorm. The Industrial Safety and Health Law on the prevention of health damage through ionizing radiation had set the limit for accumulated radiation dosage in radiation management zones at 1.3 millisieverts over three months, so the maximum level is 2.6 microsieverts/hour. In both dorms, the radiation levels were higher. These doses are, however, well below the level to affect human health. According to the law, the "business operator" is responsible for "managing radiation dosage and the prevention of contamination", Toshiba and Kajima said that TEPCO was responsible, but a TEPCO official commented, "From the perspective of protecting workers from radiation, the business operators (that constructed the shelters) are managing radiation dosage and the prevention of contamination", in this way suggesting that Toshiba and Kajima were to take the care of the zone management.

== Preventing hydrogen explosions ==
On 26 September 2011, after the discovery of hydrogen in a pipe leading to the containment vessel of reactor no.1, NISA instructed TEPCO to check whether hydrogen was building up in reactor no. 2 and 3 as well. TEPCO announced that measurements of hydrogen would be taken in reactor no. 1, before any nitrogen was injected to prevent explosions. When hydrogen would be detected at the other reactors, nitrogen injections would follow.

After the discovery of hydrogen concentrations between 61 and 63 percent in pipes of the containment of reactor no. 1, nitrogen injections were started on 8 October. On 10 October, TEPCO announced that the concentrations were, at that moment, low enough to prevent explosions, and even if the concentration would rise again, it would not exceed 4 percent, the lowest level that would pose the risk of an explosion. On the evening of 9 October, two holes were drilled into a pipe to install a filter for radioactive substances inside the containment vessel; this was 2 weeks behind the schedule TEPCO had set for itself.

== Investigations inside the reactors ==
On 19 January 2012, the interior of the primary containment vessel of reactor 2 was inspected with an industrial endoscope. This device, 8.5 millimeters in diameter, was equipped with a 360 degrees-view camera and a thermometer to measure the temperature and the cooling water inside, in an attempt to calibrate the existing temperature measurements that could have an error margin of 20 degrees. The device was brought in by a hole at 2.5 meters above the floor where the vessel is located. The procedure lasted 70 minutes. The photos showed parts of the walls and pipes inside the containment vessel. But they were unclear and blurred, most likely due to water vapors and the radiation inside. According to TEPCO the photos showed no serious damage. The temperature measured inside was 44.7 degrees Celsius, and did not differ much from the 42.6 degrees measured outside the vessel.

=== Inspections of the suppression chambers reactor no. 2 and 3 ===
On 14 March 2012, for the first time after the accidents, six workers were sent into the basements of reactor no. 2 and 3, to examine the suppression chambers. Behind the door of the suppression chamber in the no. 2 reactor building, 160 millisieverts/hour was measured. The door to the suppression chamber in the no. 3 reactor building was damaged and could not be opened. In front of this door, the radiation level measurement was 75 millisieverts/hour. For reactors to be decommissioned, access to the suppression chambers is vital for conducting repairs to the containment structures. According to TEPCO, this work should be done with robots, because these places with high levels of radiation could be hostile to humans. TEPCO released some video footage of the work at the suppression chambers of the No. 2 and 3 reactors.

On 26 and 27 March 2012, the inside of the containment vessel of reactor 2 was inspected with a 20 meter long endoscope. With this, a dosimeter was brought into the vessel to measure the radiation levels inside. At the bottom of the primary containment structure, 60 centimeters of water was found, instead of the 3 meters expected. The radiation level measured was 72.9 sieverts per hour. Because of this, the endoscope could only function for a few hours. For reactors number 1 and 3, no endoscopic survey was planned at that time, because the actual radiation levels were too high for humans.

== Management of contaminated water ==
Continued cooling of the melted reactor cores is required in order to remove excess heat. Due to damage to the integrity of the reactor vessels, radioactive water accumulates inside the reactor and turbine buildings. To decontaminate the contaminated water, TEPCO installed radioaction water treatment systems.

The Japanese government had initially requested the assistance of the Russian floating water decontamination plant Landysh to process the radioactive water from the damaged reactors, but negotiations with the Russian government were an extremely slow process and it is unclear if the plant was ever sent to Fukushima. Landysh was built by Russia with funding from Japan to process liquid wastes produced during the decommissioning of nuclear submarines.

As of early September 2011, the operating rate of the filtering system exceeded the target of 90 percent for the first time. 85,000 tons of water were decontaminated by 11 September, with over 100,000 tons of waste water remaining to be treated at the time. The nuclear waste generated by the filters had already filled almost 70 percent of the 800 cubic meters of storage space available at the time. TEPCO had to figure out how to cool the reactors with less than 15 tons of water per day in order to reduce the growth of waste water and nuclear waste to more manageable levels.

=== Installation of circulating water cooling system ===
Side view of the Fukushima trenches and tunnels. 1: Reactor building, 2: Turbine generator and associated condenser (large black colored vessel).

In order to remove decay heat of the severely damaged cores of Units 1–3, TEPCO injected cooling water into the reactors. As the reactors appear to have holes around the bottom, the water dissolved the water-soluble fission products, which then accumulated in the basement of the turbine building (see the adjacent diagram) through any leaks from the water-injected reactor buildings. Since the accumulated radioactive water was a risk, TEPCO tried to transfer it.

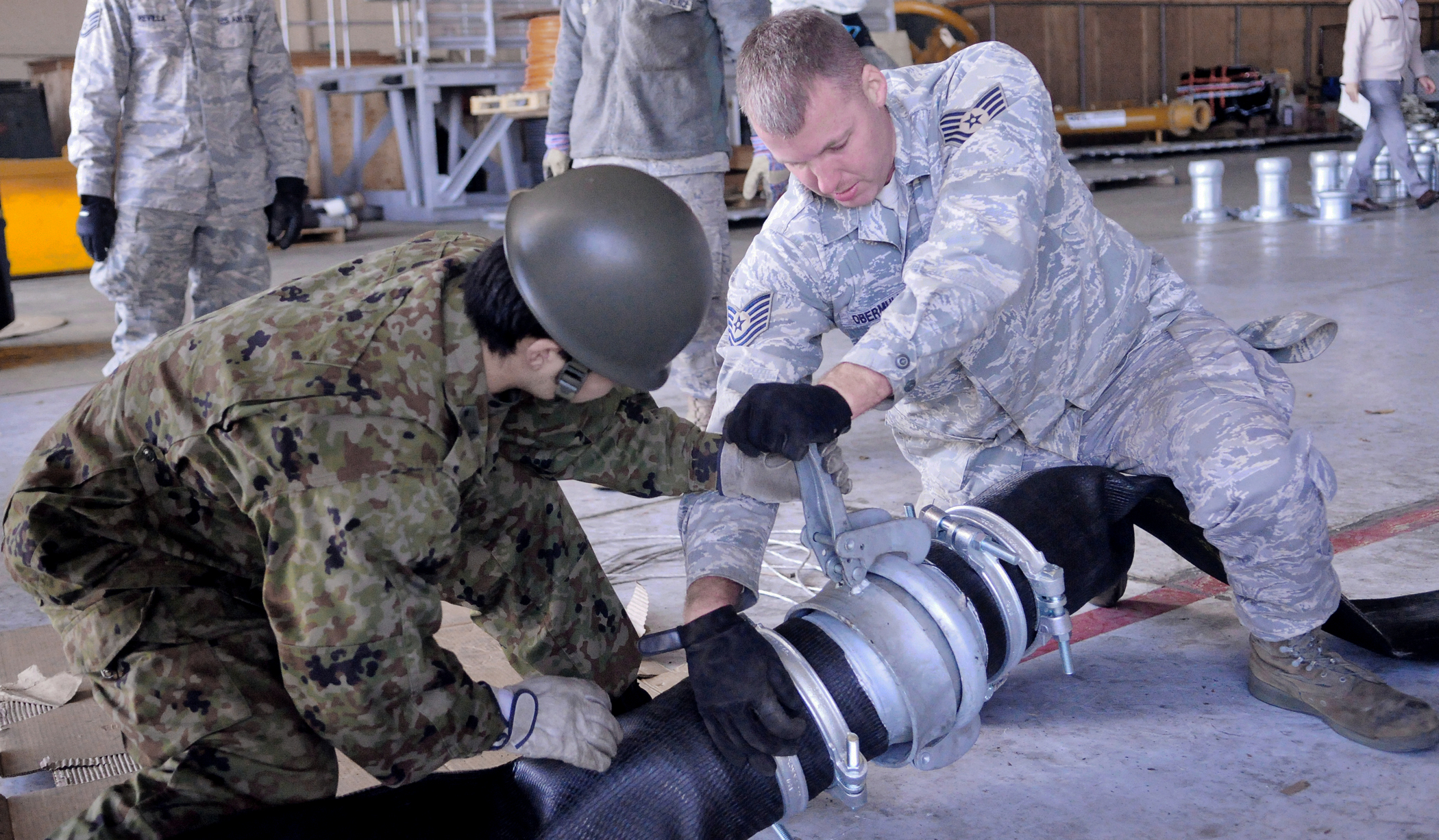
Assembly of hose fittings for Fukushima complex, Yokota AB

As the accumulated water in the basement of the turbine building of Units 2 and 3 was radioactive, TEPCO needed to remove it. They had initially planned to pump the water to the condenser (see diagram). TEPCO abandoned that plan after discovering the condensers on both units were already full of water. Pumps capable of processing 10–25 tons of water per hour were used to transfer condenser water into other storage tanks, freeing up condenser storage for the water in the basements. Since both the storage tanks and the condensers were nearly full, TEPCO also considered using floating tanker ships as a temporary storage location for the radioactive water. Regardless of the availability of offshore storage for radioactive-contaminated water, TEPCO discharged 11,500 tons of its least contaminated water (which was still approximately 100 times the legal limit for radioactivity) into the sea on 5 April 2011 in order to free up storage space. On the same day, TEPCO began pumping water from the condensers of units 1–3 to their respective condensation storage tanks to free room for the trench water (see below).

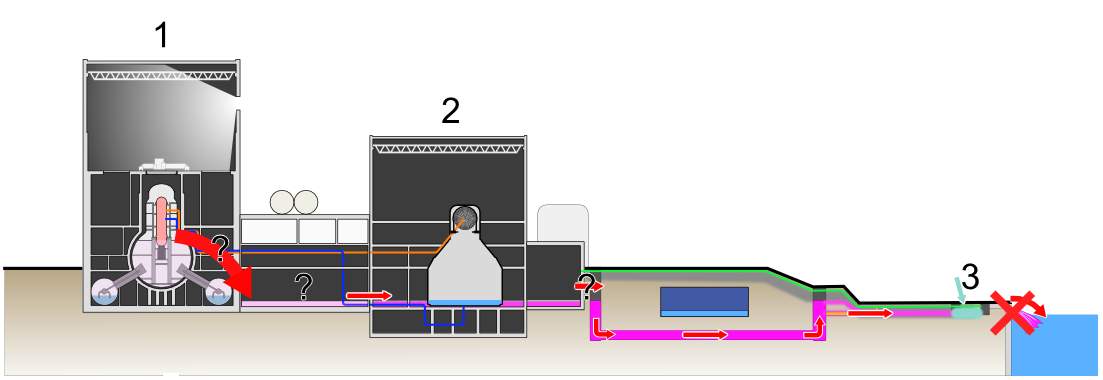
Route of leakage of radioactive water of the Fukushima plant through a gravel layer. 1: Reactor building, 2: Turbine building, 3: Injection of sodium silicate.

=== Removal of accumulated water in seawater piping trench ===
The Fukushima Daiichi NPS has several seawater piping trenches that were originally designed to house pipes and cables running from the Units 2–4 turbine buildings to their seaside, which do not directly connect to the sea. Inside the trench, radioactive contaminated water has been accumulating since the accident. Due to the risk of soil or ocean contamination from these trenches, TEPCO has been trying to remove the accumulated water in the trenches by pumping it back into the turbine buildings, as well as backfilling the trenches to reduce or prevent further incursion of contaminated water.

=== Groundwater contamination ===
On 5 July 2013, TEPCO found 9 kBq/L of ^{134}Cs and 18 kBq/L of ^{137}Cs in a sample taken from a monitoring well close to the coastline. Compared with samples taken three days earlier, the levels were 90 times higher. The cause was unknown. The monitoring well is situated close to another monitoring well that had previously leaked radioactive water into the sea in April 2011. A sample of groundwater from another well situated about 100 meters south of the first well showed that the radioactivity had risen by 18 times over the course of 4 days, with 1.7 kBq/L of strontium and other radioactive substances. A day later the readings in the first well were 11 kBq/L of ^{134}Cs and 22 kBq/L of ^{137}Cs, 111 times and 105 times greater than the samples of 5 July. TEPCO did not know the reasons for the higher readings, but the monitoring was to be intensified.

More than a month after the groundwater contamination was discovered, TEPCO started to contain the radioactive groundwater. They assumed that the radioactivity had escaped early in the beginning of the accident in 2011, but NRA experts had serious doubts about their assumption. According to them, other sources could not be excluded. Numerous pipes were running everywhere on the reactor grounds to cool the reactors and decontaminate the water used, and leaks could be anywhere. TEPCO's solution resulted in redirection of the groundwater flows, which could have spread the radioactive contamination further. TEPCO also had plans for pumping groundwater. At that time the turbine buildings of units 2 and 3 contained 5000 and 6000 cubic meters of radioactive water respectively. With wells in contact with the turbine buildings, this could spread the radioactivity into the ground. The NRA announced that it would form a task force to find the leaks and to block the flow of the groundwater to the coastline, because the NRA suspected that the groundwater was leaking into the sea.

=== Timeline of contaminated water treatment ===
2011

On 27 March
TEPCO announced that radioactive water had accumulated in the basement of the Unit 2 turbine building.
On 28 March
The Japanese Nuclear Safety Commission advised TEPCO to take all possible measures to avoid the accumulated water in the Unit 2 turbine building leaking into the ground and the sea (hereinafter called "the JNSC advice").
On 2 April
TEPCO announced the outflow of fluid containing radioactive materials to the ocean from areas near the intake channel of Unit 2. The fluid source was a 20 cm crack on the concrete lateral of the pit that appeared to have been created by the earthquake. TEPCO attempted to inject fresh concrete, polymeric water absorbent, sawdust, and shredded newspapers into the crack; this approach failed to slow the leak. After an investigation of the water flow, TEPCO began to inject sodium silicate on 5 April, and the outflow was stopped on 6 April. The total amount and radioactivity of the outflow from the crack was estimated to be approximately 520 m^{3} and approximately 4.7 PBq respectively.
On 17 April
TEPCO announced the Roadmap towards Restoration from the Accident at Fukushima Daiichi Nuclear Power Station.
On 27 April
In order to prevent the outflow of the highly radioactive water at the turbine building of Unit 2, the water was transferred to the Centralized Radiation Waste Treatment Facility since 19 April. TEPCO planned to install facilities for processing the stored water and reusing treated water to inject it into the reactors.
On 11 May
TEPCO investigated possible leakage of radioactive water to the outside from around the intake canal of Unit 3 in response to employees' report of water flowing into the pit via power cable pipe lines.
On 23 May
Nuclear and Industrial Safety Agency began to use the term "Contaminated Water" as the water with high concentration of radioactive materials.
On 17 June
TEPCO began the operation of the cesium adsorption apparatus (Kurion) and the decontamination apparatus (AREVA).
On 17 August
TEPCO began the (test) operation of SARRY, which is the second cesium adsorption apparatus (TOSHIBA).
On 28 August
2 TEPCO workers at the plant were exposed to radiation by mistake while they were replacing parts of the contaminated water processing system. The next Wednesday, 31 August, two other workers were sprayed with highly contaminated water when the water splashed from a container with a leaking valve that did not close. It was found that they were exposed to 0.16 and 0.14 millisieverts. The last man wore a raincoat. No immediate symptoms were found.
On 21 December
TEPCO announced Mid-and-long-Term Roadmap towards the Decommissioning of Fukushima Daiichi Nuclear Power Units 1–4.

2012

On 5 April
A leaking pipe was found at 1.00 AM. The leakage stopped an hour after the valves were closed. 12,000 liters of water with high levels of radioactive strontium were lost. According to TEPCO, much of this water escaped through a nearby sewer system into the ocean. Investigations were expected to reveal how much water was lost into the ocean, and how the joint could fail. A similar leakage at the same facility happened on 26 March 2012.
On 19 September
Nuclear Regulation Authority (NRA) was established.

2013

On 30 March
TEPCO began the operation of ALPS, which is the multi-nuclide removal equipment.
On 22 July
With announcing the situation on seawater and groundwater, TEPCO admitted that contaminated groundwater had been leaking into the ocean since March 2011.
On 27 July
TEPCO announced that extremely high levels of tritium and cesium were found in a pit containing about 5000 cubic meters of water on the sea side of the Unit 2 reactor building. 8.7 MBq/liter of tritium and 2.35 GBq/liter of cesium was measured. The NRA was concerned that leaks from the pit could release high tritium levels into the sea and that there was still water flowing from the reactor into the turbine building and into the pit. TEPCO believed that this pollution was there from the first days in 2011, and had stayed there. Nevertheless, TEPCO would control the site for leaks, and seal the soil around the pit.
On 30 May
The Government of Japan decided on a policy to prevent the groundwater flowing in the reactor buildings. A frozen soil wall (Land-side of Impermeable Wall) was scheduled for introduction to block the flow of groundwater and prevent its mixing with contaminated water.
On 19 August
Contaminated water leakage from a flange type tank was found in the H4 area. The incident was evaluated by the NRA as a provisional rating Level 3 on the eight-level INES. In response to this incident, the NRA recommended that TEPCO should replace the flange type tank, which was prone to leak water, with a welded type tank.
On 28 August
A subcontractor employee was contaminated on his face, head and chest while transferring water from the damaged tank. After decontamination, 5,000 cpm were still measured on his head; the readings from prior to decontamination were not released. The man was released, but ordered to have a whole-body radiation count later.
On 2 September
It was reported that radiation near another tank was measured at 1.8 Sv/h, 18 times higher than previously thought. TEPCO had initially recorded radiation at about 100 mSv/h, but later admitted that that was because the equipment they were using could only read measurements up to that level. The latest reading came from a more advanced device capable of measuring higher levels. The buildup of water at the site was reported to be close to becoming unmanageable and experts said that TEPCO will soon be left with no choice but to release the water into the ocean or evaporate it.
On 3 September
The Nuclear Emergency Response Headquarters published "the Government's Decision on Addressing the Contaminated Water Issue at TEPCO's Fukushima Daiichi NPS".
On 12 September
Contaminated water leakage from storage tanks was found in the H4 area.

=== Suggestions of dumping cooling water ===
In September 2019, the contaminated cooling water had almost reached storage capacity. Japan's environment minister Yoshiaki Harada suggested, that there was only one recourse: "release it into the ocean and dilute it... there are no other options." A day later, Yoshiaki Harada was taken out of his function, after protests. His successor Shinjiro Koizumi apologized to the fishermen in Fukushima at a meeting in Iwaki City. The new minister promised to take a strong view of the facts, and to push for reconstruction.

In 2020, the storage of contaminated water reached over a million tons, stored in large containers at the grounds of the plant. It was predicted that in 2022, the storage capacity could be exceeded. Therefore, a proposal was made in spring 2020, to start discharging the cooling water into the ocean. Hiroshi Kishi, the president of JF Zengyoren, the headman of many fishermen cooperatives, strongly opposed this proposal at a meeting with Japanese government representatives. According to Kishi, any release of cooling water could prompt other countries to reinforce restrictions on imports of Japanese fishery products, reversing a recent trend toward easing.

== Radioactive waste ==
Cooling the reactors with recirculated and decontaminated water from the basements proved successful, but as a consequence, this radioactive waste was accumulating in the temporary storage facility at the plant. TEPCO decided in the first week of October to use the "Sally" decontamination system built by Toshiba Corporation and keep the Kurion/Areva system as backup.

On 27 September, after three months operation, some 4,700 drums with radioactive waste had accumulated at the plant. The Kurion and Sally systems both used zeolites to concentrate cesium. After the zeolite was saturated, the vessels with the zeolite were designated as nuclear waste. By now, 210 Kurion-made vessels with a total of 307 cubic meters, each vessel measuring 0.9 meters in diameter and 2.3 meters in height had accumulated at the plant. The Areva-filters used sand to absorb radioactive materials and chemicals were used to reactivate the filters. In this way, 581 cubic meters of highly contaminated sludge were produced.

According to Professor Akio Koyama of the Kyoto University Research Reactor Institute, the density of high-level decontaminated water was believed to contain 10 gigabecquerel per liter, but if this is condensed to polluted sludge and zeolites, this density could increase 10,000 fold. These densities could not be dealt with using conventional systems.

=== Spent fuel pools ===
On 16 August 2011, TEPCO announced the installation of desalination equipment in the spent fuel pools of reactor 2, 3, and 4. These pools had been cooled with seawater for some time, and TEPCO feared the salt would corrode the stainless steel pipes and pool wall liners. The Unit 4 spent fuel pool was the first to have the equipment installed. The spent fuel pools of reactor 2 and 3 came next. TEPCO expected to achieve removal of 96% of the salt in the spent fuel pools within two months.

==== Unit 4 spent fuel removal ====
On 22 December 2014, TEPCO crews completed the removal of all fuel assemblies from the spent fuel pool of reactor 4. 1331 spent fuel assemblies were moved to the ground-level common spent fuel pool, and 204 unused fuel assemblies were moved to the spent fuel pool of reactor 6 (Unit 4 was out of service for refueling at the time of the 2011 accident, so the spent fuel pool contained a number of unused new fuel assemblies).

==== Unit 3 spent fuel removal ====
On 15 April 2019, began the process of removing the fuel assemblies from the pool of Unit 3. On 28 February 2021, the removal of all spent fuel from the fuel pool of reactor 3 was completed. On the top of the roof of the reactor a fuel handling machine crane had been built, which has been used to remove 566 fuel assemblies from the pool.

==== Unit 2 spent fuel removal ====
615 fuel assemblies lay in the spent fuel pool. Removal operations started in June 2026 and may end in 2028.

==== Unit 1 spent fuel removal ====
392 fuel assemblies lay in the spent fuel pool. Removal operations have yet to begin. The operations may start in 2027-2028.

== Debris removal ==
On 10 April 2011, TEPCO began using remote-controlled, unmanned heavy equipment to remove sample debris from around reactors 1–3. The debris and rubble, caused by hydrogen explosions at reactors 1 and 3, was impeding recovery operations both by being in the way and emitting high radioactivity. The debris will be placed into containers and kept at the plant. TEPCO plans to remove the remaining molten fuel debris from the reactor containments of Units 1, 2, and 3 by about 2050.

== Proposed building protections ==
Because the monsoon season begins in June in Japan, it became urgent to protect the damaged reactor buildings from storms, typhoons, and heavy rainfall. As a short-term solution, TEPCO envisaged to apply a light cover on the remaining structures above the damaged reactors. As of mid-June 2011, TEPCO released its plan to use automated cranes to move structures into place over the reactor. This strategy is an attempt to keep as many people away from the reactors as possible, while still covering the damaged reactors.

=== Proposed sarcophagus ===
On 18 March 2011, Reuters reported that Hidehiko Nishiyama, Japan's nuclear agency spokesman when asked about burying the reactors in sand and concrete, said: "That solution is in the back of our minds, but we are focused on cooling the reactors down." Considered a last-ditch effort since it would not provide cooling, such a plan would require massive reinforcement under the floor, as in the Chernobyl Nuclear Power Plant sarcophagus.

=== Scrapping reactors Daiichi 1–4 ===
On 7 September 2011, TEPCO president Toshio Nishizawa said that the 4 damaged reactors will be scrapped. This announcement came at a session of the Fukushima Prefectural Assembly, which was investigating the accident at the plant. Whether the six other remaining reactors (Daiichi 5, 6, Daini 1, 2, 3, 4) should be abolished too would be decided based on the opinions of local municipalities.

On 28 October 2011, the Japanese Atomic Energy Commission presented a timetable in a draft report, titled "how to scrap the Fukushima reactors". It stated that within 10 years, a start should be made with the retrieval of the melted fuel within the reactors. First, the containment vessels of reactors 1, 2 and 3 should be repaired to prevent radiation releases, then all should be filled with water. Decommissioning would take more than 30 years, because the pressure vessels of the reactor vessels are damaged. After the accident at Three Mile Island in 1979, some 70 percent of the fuel rods had melted. There, the retrieval of the fuel was started in 1985, and completed in 1990. The work at Fukushima was expected to take significantly longer because of the far greater damage and the fact that 4 reactors would need to be decommissioned all at the same time.

After discussions were started in August 2011, on 9 November 2011, a panel of experts of Japan's Atomic Energy Commission completed a schedule for scrapping the damaged reactors. The panel's conclusions were:

- The scrapping will take 30 years or longer.
- First, the containment vessels needed to be repaired, then filled with water to block radiation.
- The reactors should be in a state of stable cold shutdown.
- Three years later, a start would be made to take all spent fuel from the 4 damaged reactors to a pool within the compound.
- Within 10 years, the removal of the melted fuel inside the reactors could begin.

This scheme was partly based on the experience gained from the 1979 Three Mile Island accident. In Fukushima, however, with three meltdowns at one site, the damage was much more extensive. It could take 30 years or more to remove the nuclear fuel, dismantle the reactors, and remove all the buildings. Research institutions all over the world were asked to participate in the construction of a research site to examine the removal of fuel and other nuclear wastes. The official publication of the report was planned for the end of 2011.

== Protection systems installed ==
Since the accident, TEPCO has installed sensors, a fabric cover over the reactors and additional filters to reduce the emission of contaminants.

=== Sensors for xenon and temperature changes to detect critical reactions ===
After the detection of radioactive xenon gas in the containment vessel of the No. 2 reactor on 1 and 2 November 2011, TEPCO was not able to determine whether this was a sustained fission process or only spontaneous fission. Therefore, TEPCO installed detection devices for radioactive xenon to single out any occurrence of nuclear criticality. Next to this TEPCO installed temperature sensors to detect temperature changes in the reactors, another indicator of possible critical fission reactions.

=== New filters ===
On 20 September 2011, the Japanese government and TEPCO announced the installation of new filters to reduce the amount of radioactive substances released into the air. In the last week of September 2011 these filters were to be installed at reactors 1, 2 and 3. Gases out of the reactors would be decontaminated before they would be released into the air. By mid October, the construction of the polyester shield over the No. 1 reactor should be completed. In the first half of September, the amount of radioactive substances released from the plant was about 200 megabecquerel per hour, according to TEPCO, that was about one four-millionths of the level of the initial stages of the accident in March 2011.

=== Fabric cover over Unit 1 ===
An effort has been undertaken to fit the three damaged reactor buildings with fabric covers and filters to limit radioactive contamination release. On 6 April 2011, sources told Kyodo News that a major construction firm was studying the idea, and that construction wouldn't "start until June". The plan had been criticized for potentially having "limited effects in blocking the release of radioactive substances into the environment". On 14 May 2011, TEPCO announced that it had begun to clear debris to create a space to install a cover over the building of reactor 1. By 13 October 2011, the roof had been completed.

=== Metal cover over Unit 3 ===
In June 2016, preparation work began to install a metal cover over the Unit 3 reactor building. In conjunction with this, a crane was to be installed to assist with the removal of the fuel rods from the storage pool. After inspection and cleaning, the removed fuel is expected to be stored in the site's communal storage facility. By February 2018 the dome-shaped roof had been completed in preparation of the removal of the fuel rods.

== Cleanup of neighboring areas ==
Significant efforts are being taken to clean up radioactive material that escaped the plant. This effort combines washing down buildings and scraping away topsoil. It has been hampered by the volume of material to be removed and the lack of adequate storage facilities.

There is also a concern that washing surfaces will merely move the radioactive material without eliminating it.

After an earlier decontamination plan to clean all areas with radiation levels above 5 millisievert per year had raised protests, the Japanese government revealed on 10 October 2011, in a meeting with experts, a revised decontamination plan. This plan included:

- all areas with radiation levels above 1 millisievert per year would be cleaned.
- no-entry zones and evacuation zones designated by the government would be the responsibility of the government.
- the rest of the areas would be cleaned by local authorities.
- in areas with radiation levels above 20 millisievert per year, decontamination would be done step by step.
- within two years, radiation levels between 5 and 20 millisieverts should be cut down to 60%.
- the Japanese government would help local authorities with disposing of the enormous amount of radioactive waste.

On 19 December 2011, the Japanese Ministry of Environment published more details about these plans for decontamination: the work would be subsidized in 102 villages and towns. Opposition against the plan came from cattle farmers in the prefecture Iwate and the tourist industry in the city of Aizuwakamatsu, because of fears that cattle sales might drop or tourism would be hurt, when the areas would be labeled to be contaminated. Areas with lower readings complained that their decontamination would not be funded.

In a Reuters story from August 2013, it was noted "[m]any have given up hope of ever returning to live in the shadow of the Fukushima nuclear plant. A survey in June showed that a third of the former residents of Iitate, a lush village famed for its fresh produce before the accident, never want to move back. Half of those said they would prefer to be compensated enough to move elsewhere in Japan to farm." In addition, despite being allowed to return home, some residents say the lack of an economy continues to make the area de facto unlivable. Compensation payments to those who have been evacuated are stopped when they are allowed to return home, but as of August 2013, decontamination of the area has progressed more slowly than expected. There have also been revelations of additional leaks (see above: storage tanks leaking contaminated water).

=== Cementing the seabed near the water intake ===
On 22 February 2012, TEPCO started cementing the seabed near the plant to prevent the spread of radioactive materials into the sea. Some 70,000 square meters of seabed around the intake of cooling water would be covered with 60 centimeters thick cement. The work was expected to take 4 months time, and prevent the spread of contaminated mud and sand for at least 50 years.

=== New definition of the no-entry zones introduced ===
On 18 December 2011, Fukushima Governor, Yuhei Sato and representatives of 11 other municipal governments near the plant, were notified at a meeting at the city of Fukushima that the three ministers in charge of handling the crises, Yokio Edano, minister of Economy, Trade and Industry, Goshi Hosono, minister of the environment, and Tatsuo Hirano, minister for reconstruction, planned to redesign the classification of the no-entry zones around the Fukushima nuclear plant. From 1 April 2012, a three level system would be introduced, by the Japanese government:

no-entry zones, with an annual radiation exposure of 50 millisieverts or more
at these places habitation would be prohibited
zones with annual radiation exposures between 20 and 50 millisieverts
here former residents could return, but with restrictions
zones with exposures of less than 20 millisieverts per year
in these zones the residents would be allowed to return to their houses

Decontamination efforts were planned in line with this order, to help people return to places where the radiation levels would be relatively low.

=== Costs of the cleanup operations ===
In mid December 2011, the local authorities in Fukushima had spent around 1.7 billion yen ($21 million) on the costs of decontamination works in the cities of Fukushima and Date and the village of Kawauchi. In 2017, the Japan Center for Economic Research estimated the total cleanup costs to be between 50 and 70 trillion yen ($470 to $660 billion), with a 2019 estimate of between 35 and 80 trillion yen; in both estimates the upper-end included removing tritium from contaminated water. For the cleanup, only 184.3 billion yen was reserved in the September supplementary budget of prefecture Fukushima, and some funds in the central government's third supplementary budget of 2011. Whenever needed, the central government would be asked for extra funding.

In 2016, University of Oxford researcher and author Peter Wynn Kirby wrote that the government had allocated the equivalent of US$15 billion for the regional cleanup and described the josen (decontamination) process, with "provisional storage areas (kari-kari-okiba) ... [and] more secure, though still temporary, storage depots (kari-okiba)". Kirby opined that the effort would be better called "transcontamination" because it was moving the contaminated material around without long-term safe storage planned or executed. He also saw little progress on handling the more intense radiation waste of the destroyed power plant site itself; or on handling the larger issue of the national nuclear program's waste, particularly given the earthquake-risk of Japan relative to secure long-term storage.

== Lessons learned to date ==
The Fukushima nuclear accident revealed the dangers of building multiple nuclear reactor units close to one another. This proximity triggered the parallel, chain-reaction accidents that led to hydrogen explosions blowing the roofs off reactor buildings and water evaporating from open-air spent fuel pools—a situation that was potentially more dangerous than the loss of reactor cooling itself. Because of the proximity of the reactors, Plant Director Masao Yoshida "was put in the position of trying to cope simultaneously with core meltdowns at three reactors and exposed fuel pools at three units".

== See also ==
- Tritiated water
- Human decontamination
- Discharge of radioactive water of the Fukushima Daiichi Nuclear Power Plant

== Sources ==
- 電気新聞, ed. (2011). 東日本大震災の記録 - 原子力事故と計画停電 -. (社)日本電気協会新聞部. (in Japanese)

Management of contaminated water

- Preventative and Multilayered Measures for Contaminated Water Treatment at the Fukushima Daiichi Nuclear Power Station of Tokyo Electric Power Company – Through completeness of comprehensive risk management (PDF), The Committee on countermeasures for contaminated water treatment, 2013
- Tritiated Water Task Force Report (PDF), Tritiated Water Task Force, 2016
- Important Stories on Decommissioning-Fukushima Daiichi Nuclear Power Station, now and in the future (PDF), METI, 2016
- Answers to Frequently Asked Questions About Cleanup Activities at Three Mile Island, Unit 2, NUREG, 1984, doi:10.2172/6861449, OSTI 6861449
- 空本 誠喜 (2014). 汚染水との闘い −福島第一原発・危機の深層−. ちくま新書. 筑摩書房. (in Japanese)
