= Chim-Pom =

Artist collective formed in Japan

Chim-Pom (stylized "Chim↑Pom") is an artist collective formed in Tokyo in 2005, when all the members were in their twenties. The six members are Ellie (エリイ), Ryūta Ushiro (卯城竜太), Yasutaka Hayashi (林靖高), Masataka Okada (岡田将孝), Toshinori Mizuno (水野俊紀) and Motomu Inaoka (稲岡求).

The group is somewhat influenced by Makoto Aida, as three of the members had been apprentices and Ellie had modeled for him. The collective has been described as "neo-Dadaist" and "the enfant terrible of Japan’s art world". Many of their projects have tackled provocative social themes.

== History ==
Chim-Pom first gained attention in 2006 with a project titled "Super Rat" (スーパー☆ラット), an installation of taxidermied rats captured from Shibuya district, which were painted to resemble Pikachu, the naming a riff on Takashi Murakami's "Superflat" reading of Japanese aesthetics. Don't Follow the Wind is long term exhibition started in 2012.It takes place inside the inaccessible radioactive Fukushima exclusion zone formed after the nuclear disaster. Initiated by Chim↑Pom and co-developed with the curators Kenji Kubota, Eva & Franco Mattes, and Jason Waite. They collaborated with displaced local residents and includes 12 artists developing new work inside the zone: Ai Weiwei, Aiko Miyanaga, Chim↑Pom, Grand Guignol Mirai, Nikolaus Hirsch and Jorge Otero-Pailos, Kota Takeuchi, Eva & Franco Mattes, Meiro Koizumi, Nobuaki Takekawa, Ahmet Ögüt, Trevor Paglen, and Taryn Simon.

== Solo exhibitions ==
- 2013 ‘"Hiroshima!!!!! Exhibition" Preparation Show' Hot Spot Galleries in Hiroshima City
- 2013 "PAVILION", Taro Okamoto Memorial Museum, Tokyo
- 2012 "Chim↑Pom", PARCO Museum, Tokyo
- 2012 "Beautiful World: SURVIVAL DANCE", PROJECT FULFILL ART SPACE, Taipei
- 2011 "LEVEL 7 feat. 'Hiroshima!!!!’,” Maruki Gallery for the Hiroshima Panels, Saitama
- 2011 "Chim↑Pom", MoMA PS1, New York
- 2011 "K-I-S-S-I-N-G", The Container, Tokyo
- 2011 "SURVIVAL DANCE", MUJIN-TO Production, Tokyo
- 2011 "REAL TIMES", MUJIN-TO Production, Tokyo (traveled to Standard bookstore, Osaka)
- 2010 "Imagine", MUJIN-TO Production, Tokyo
- 2009 "FujiYAMA, GEISHA, JAPAnEse!!,” MUJIN-TO Production, Tokyo
- 2009 "Good to be human", YAMAMOTO GENDAI, Tokyo
- 2009 "Hiroshima!!,” NADiff a/p/a/r/t, Tokyo
- 2009 "Disposed Dick", Gallery Vagina (a.k.a. MUJIN-TO Production), Tokyo
- 2009 "Hiroshima!,” Vacant, Tokyo
- 2008 "Oh My God! –A Miami Beach Feeling–,” MUJIN-TO Production, Tokyo
- 2008 "Becoming Friends, Eating Each Other or Falling Down Together / BLACK OF DEATH curated by MUJIN-TO Production", hiromiyoshii, Tokyo
- 2008 "Japanese Art is 10 Years Behind", NADiff a/p/a/r/t, Tokyo
- 2007 "Thank You Celeb Project – I'm BOKAN", MUJIN-TO Production, Tokyo
- 2007 "Oh My God!,” MUJIN-TO Production, Tokyo
- 2006 "SUPER☆RAT", MUJIN-TO Production, Tokyo

== Selected group exhibitions ==
- 2017 "First Things Don't Come First", curated by Native Art Department International, the Fabulous Festival of Fringe Film, Durham, Ontario, Canada
- 2013 "SHIBUKARU MATSURI", Shibuya PARCO, Tokyo
- 2013 "Atomic Surplus", CCA Muñoz Waxman Galleries, New Mexico
- 2013 "adidas Originals PRESENTS BETTER NEVER THAN LATE", Kodachi Seisakujo, Tokyo
- 2013 "Now Japan; Exhibition with 37 contemporary Japanese artists", Kunsthal KAdE, the Netherlands
- 2013 "inToAsia: Time-based Art Festival 2013 – MicroCities", Stephan Stoyanov Gallery, New York
- 2013 "Why not live for Art? II – 9 collectors reveal their treasures", Tokyo Opera City Art Gallery, Tokyo
- 2013 "Takahashi Collection – Mindfulness", Kirishima Open-Air Museum, Kagoshima
- 2013 "MOT collection – From Me to You –Close but Distant Journeys–,” Museum of Contemporary Art Tokyo
- 2013 "All You Need Is LOVE: From Chagall to Kusama and Hatsune Miku", Mori Art Museum, Tokyo
- 2012 "Artists and the Disaster –Documentation in Progress–,” Contemporary Art Gallery, Art Tower Mito
- 2012 "The 9th Shanghai Biennale – REACTIVATION", Shanghai Museum of Contemporary Art
- 2012 "Project Daejeon 2012: Energy", Daejeon Museum of Art, South Korea
- 2012 "Son et Lumière, et sagesse profonde", 21st Century Museum of Contemporary Art, Kanazawa
- 2012 "Get Up, Stand Up", Seattle Art Museum
- 2012 "The Angel of History – I Love Art 12 Photography", Watari-um Museum, Tokyo
- 2012 "Turning Around" (curated by Chim↑Pom), Watari-um Museum, Tokyo
- 2012 "Double Vision: Contemporary Art from Japan", Moscow Museum of Modern Art (traveled to Haifa Museum of Art, Israel)
- 2012 "The Fire that Doesn't Go Out", Richard D. Baron Gallery, Ohio
- 2012 "TPAM in Yokohama 2012", BankART Mini, Yokohama
- 2011 "Life, no Peace, only Adventure", Busan Museum of Art, South Korea
- 2011 "Villa Tokyo", Kyobashi area, Tokyo
- 2011 "Sky of Elpis", TOKYO DESIGNERS WEEK 2011 (TDW-ART), Tokyo
- 2011 "SHIBUKARU MATSURI", Shibuya PARCO, Tokyo
- 2011 "City_net Asia 2011: Asian Contemporary Art Project", Seoul Museum of Art
- 2011 "Mildura Palimpsest #8 – Collaborators and Saboteurs", Arts Mildura, Mildura, Australia
- 2011 "Invisibleness is Visibleness: International Contemporary Art Collection of a Salaryman – Daisuke Miyatsu", Museum of Contemporary Art, Taipei
- 2011 "Never give up!,” PASS THE BATON GALLERY, Tokyo
- 2010 "The 29th São Paulo Biennial – There is always a cup of sea to sail in", Ciccillo Matarazzo Pavilion, Ibirapuera Park, São Paulo
- 2010 "Asia Art Award", SOMA Museum of Art, Seoul
- 2010 "Roppongi Crossing 2010: Can There Be Art?,” Mori Art Museum, Tokyo
- 2010 "REFLECTION: alternative worlds through the video camera", Contemporary Art Gallery, Art Tower Mito
- 2010 "Moving – The first and final group exhibition in MUJIN-TO, Koenji", MUJIN-TO Production, Tokyo
- 2009 "Good to be a mummy", YAMAMOTO GENDAI, Tokyo
- 2009 "Spooky Action at a Distance: A Big in Japan exhibition of new video works from Japanese artists", Black & Blue Gallery, Sydney
- 2009 "A Blow to the Everyday", Osage Kwun Tong, Hong Kong
- 2009 "Urban Stories: The X Baltic Triennial of International Art", Contemporary Art Centre [CAC], Vilnius, Lithuania
- 2009 "Winter Garden: The Exploration of the Micropop Imagination in Contemporary Japanese Art", Hara Museum of Contemporary Art, Tokyo
- 2008 "DEATH BY BASEL", Fredric Snitzer Gallery, Miami
- 2008 "TOKYO NONSENSE", SCION Installation L.A., Los Angeles
- 2008 "KITA!!: Japanese Artists Meet Indonesia" Jogja National Museum, Yogyakarta, Indonesia
- 2008 "When Lives Become Form: Dialogue with the Future – Brazil, Japan", The Museum of Modern Art of São Paulo
- 2008 "New Tokyo Contemporaries", (marunouchi) HOUSE, Tokyo
- 2007 "Emotion Burglar", BankART Studio NYK, Yokohama
- 2007 "DAIWA RADIATOR FACTORY VIEWING ROOM vol.4", DAIWA RADIATOR FACTORY VIEWING ROOM, Hiroshima
- 2007 "Re-Act: New Art Competition 2007", Hiroshima City Museum of Contemporary Art

== Awards ==
- 2007 "New Art Competition 2007", Hiroshima City Museum of Contemporary Art Award

== Public collections ==
Mori Art Museum (JAPAN)
Museum of Contemporary Art Tokyo (JAPAN)
The Japan Foundation (JAPAN)
21st Century Museum of Contemporary Art, Kanazawa (JAPAN)
Asia Society Museum, New York (U.S.A.)
Queensland Art Gallery (AUSTRALIA)

== Publications ==
"SUPER RAT" (Parco Publishing, 2012)
"idea ink 03 – Geijutsu Jikkohan" (written by Chim↑Pom, Asahi Publishing, 2012)
"Chim↑Pom" (Kawade Shobo Shinsha, 2010)
"Why we can’t make the sky of Hiroshima 'PIKA!’?” (co-edited by Chim↑Pom and Abe Kenichi, MUJIN-TO Production, 2009)

== Discography (DVD) ==
- 2009 3rd DVD "Joy to Love"
- 2007 2nd DVD "The Making of Thank You Celeb Project – I’m BOKAN"
- 2006 1st DVD "P.T.A. (Pink Touch Action)”
