= Tsubasa Kato =

Japanese artist

Tsubasa Kato (加藤 翼, Katō Tsubasa, born 8 September 1984) is a Japanese contemporary artist. He made his debut at the "Roppongi Crossing 2010" exhibition at Mori Art Museum, Tokyo and received the Kengo Kuma Prize, after earning M.F.A from the Tokyo University of the Arts. In 2015, he received a fellowship from the Agency for Cultural Affairs of Japan Government and participated in Japan-US Exchange Friendship Program in the Arts as Visitor Research Scholar of University of Washington in Seattle for two years. Since 2007, he is known for his Pull and Raise project.

== Selected exhibition catalogues ==
- Co/Inspiration in Catastrophes. Texts by Huang Chien-Hung, Yuki Pan. MOCA Taipei, Taiwan. 2019
- Aichi Triennale 2019 : Taming Y/Our Passion. Texts by Daisuke Tsuda, Shihoko Iida, Yoko Nose, Pedro Reyes, Meruro Washida, Eijun Sugihara, Chiaki Soma, Takuya Oyama, Daiya Aida, and Hiroki Azuma. Seikatsunotomosha | Aichi Triennale 2019, Japan.
- Catastrophe and the Power of Art. Texts by Kenichi Kondo, Futoshi Hoshino, J.J. Charlesworth, and Gerrit Jasper Schenk. Heibonsha | Mori Art Museum, Tokyo, Japan. 2018
- Reenacting History_Collective Actions and Everyday Gestures. Texts by BAE Myungji, SEO Hyun-Suk, PARK Joon-Sang, and CHO Soojin. MMCA, Gwacheon, South Korea. 2017
- Uprisings. Texts by Nicole Brenez, Judith Butler, Georges Didi-Huberman, Marie-José Mondzain, Antonio Negri, and Jacques Rancière. Éditions Gallimard | Jeu de Paume, Paris, France. 2016ーー[itinerary: Galerie de l’ UQAM and Cinémathèque québécoise, Montreal, Canada | MUAC, Mexico City, Mexico | SESC, São Paulo, Brazil | MUNTREF, Buenos Aires, Argentina | MNAC, Barcelona, Spain
- Spider’ s Thread – Spinning images of Japanese beauty. Texts by Daisaburo Okumoto, Masatoshi Tsuzuku, Kyoko Fujii, and Miyuki Naruse. Toyota Municipal Museum of Art, Aichi, Japan. 2016
- Time of Others. Texts by Che Kyongfa, Azusa Hashimoto, Michelle Ho, and Reuben Keehan. Museum of Contemporary Art of Tokyo | The National Museum of Art Osaka | Singapore Art Museum, Queensland art Gallery / Gallery of Modern Art | The Japan Foundation Asia Center. 2015

== Selected film screenings ==
- BECOMING A COLLECTIVE BODY, MAXXI, Rome, Italy. 2020
- EXPO 1: New York - Rockaway Call For Ideas, VW Dome2, New York, USA. 2013

== Public collections ==
- Mori Art Museum, Tokyo, Japan
- National Museum of Art, Osaka, Japan
- Toyota Municipal Museum of Art, Aichi, Japan
