= Koki Tanaka (artist) =

Japanese artist and videographer (born 1975)

Koki Tanaka (田中 功起, born December 6, 1975) is a Japanese artist and videographer. He was a visiting scholar at Tokyo Zokei University. His work is Minimalist, and primarily focused with finding the unusual in everyday objects and situations.

== Career ==
Tanaka was born in Mashiko, Tochigi in 1975. In 1998, he studied abroad at the Academy of Fine Arts, Vienna. In 2000, he graduated from Tokyo Zokei University. In 2005, he earned a master's degree from Tokyo University of the Arts. After graduation, Tanaka lived in Paris, funded by the Pola Art Foundation. He later studied in Los Angeles with the support of an Agency for Cultural Affairs program.

Tanaka has held exhibitions at the Art Tower Mito, the Toyota Municipal Museum of Art, the Museum of Modern Art, Gunma, Hara Museum of Contemporary Art, Hammer Museum, Museum of Art, Seoul National Museum of Modern Art, Kyoto, and the Kunsthaus Graz.

Tanaka represented Japan at the Venice Biennale in 2013. He was Deutsche Bank's "Artist of the Year" in 2015.

In 2017, Tanaka exhibited at the Skulptur Projekte Münster. His piece was of eight Münster residents with diverse backgrounds in a workshop on how to live together. The exhibition was temporarily closed after some of the equipment used in the installation were stolen in a string of vandalism and theft at the event.

In 2018 he was a Japan Cultural Envoy as part of another Agency for Cultural Affairs program.

== Style ==
Early in his career, Tanaka was fascinated with forms and looping video of everyday phenomenon. As his career progressed, he began making videos of ordinary objects being repetitively manipulated, focusing entirely on the object, rather than the person interacting with it. After moving to Los Angeles in 2010, Tanaka began moving in a new direction where he would ask multiple people to do the same thing at once, such getting a hair cut from nine hair stylists at the same time, or having five pianists play on the same piano at once. This would remove the participants from their routine, and challenges the ordinary in a similar way to his earlier work. Tanaka's process involves gathering and then assembling cheap, easy to find objects, such as those found in 100-yen shops.

After the Fukushima Daiichi Nuclear Disaster, Tanaka's work began to focus on the temporary communities brought together by crisis.
