= Marcello Farabegoli =

Italian curator living in Vienna

Marcello Farabegoli (born March 20, 1973, in Cesena) is an Italian curator living in Vienna.

Marcello Farabegoli grew up in Bolzano-Bozen. After completing a master's degree in physics at the University of Vienna he participated in several environmental and cultural organizations in Berlin. He was also a research assistant at the Physics department at the University of Potsdam. There he investigated the correlation between physics and aesthetics. Between 2005 - 2010, he ran a gallery for contemporary Japanese art in Berlin. Since 2010, Farabegoli was based in Vienna and worked in the Old Master Painting department at the Dorotheum auction house. Since 2013, Farabegoli worked mainly as a freelance curator and producer of art projects. In April 2017, Ambassador Giorgio Marrapodi on behalf of the President of the Italian Republic, Sergio Mattarella, has awarded Marcello Farabegoli the Italian distinction of Cavaliere dell'Ordine della Stella d'ltalia (Knight of the Order of the Star of Italy)

== Selected projects ==
- 2019, 150 Years Japan - Austria: JAPAN UNLIMITED, frei_raum Q21 exhibition space MuseumsQuartier Wien with Makoto Aida, Chim↑Pom, Gianmaria Gava, Edgar Honetschläger, Sachiko Kazama, Jake Knight, BuBu de la Madeleine & Yoshiko Shimada, Midori Mitamura, Yoshinori Niwa, Ryts Monet, Tomoko Sawada, Sputniko!, Ryudai Takano, Shinpei Takeda, Momoyo Torimitsu, Hana Usui, Tomoko Yoneda and Naoko Yoshimoto. Inaugurated by Elisabeth Hajek, Artistic Director frei_raum Q21 exhibition space / MQ, Marcus Bergmann, Ambassador and Deputy Head of Section V for External Cultural Relations of the Austrian Ministry for Europe, Integration and Foreign Affairs (BMEIA), Diethard Leopold, President of the Austrian-Japanese Society, and Marcello Farabegoli, curator of the exhibition. Side events with Judith Brandner (ORF), Lucas Gehrmann (Kunsthalle Wien), Felicitas Thun-Hohenstein (Academy of Fine Arts Vienna & Austrian pavilion Venice Biennale), Niklass Maak (FAZ), Diethard Leopold (ÖJG), Bernhard Scheid (Austrian Academy of Sciences), Gerorg Schneider (Japannual), Monika Sommer (Haus der Geschichte Österreich), Markus Wurzer (University of Graz) and others.
- 2019, FOTO WIEN: Eat Me by Ben G. Fodor at Studio Kucsko. Opening & premiere with Ben G. Fodor (photography), Dorothee Frank (text), Christoph Dostal (recitation), and Matthias Loibner (music). Curated by Marcello Farabegoli.
- 2018, special project of the Vienna Art Week at Verein 08:Thursday Demonstration. Portrait of a Movement by Luca Faccio. Opening and round table with Frederick Baker (filmmaker), Luca Faccio (artist), Lucas Gehrmann (curator at Kunsthalle Wien), Helga Köcher (social sculptor) and moderator Dorothee Frank (Ö1 journalist). Curated by Marcello Farabegoli.
- 2017, special project of the Vienna Art Week at ARCC.art open space: exhibition Carmine by Ben G. Fodor and round table about Art & Science with Georg Gottlob, professor of informatics at Oxford University & TU-Vienna, Gerfried Stocker, artistic director of Ars Electronica, Ben G. Fodor, artist, and Marcello Farabegoli, curator of the exhibition / moderated by Dorothee Frank, journalist at Ö1.
- 2017, section project statements of the Parallel Vienna: Parallel & concordant with Ben G. Fodor & Dorothee Frank, Clemens Fürtler & Michaela Seiser, Inge GRAF & Walter ZYX, Karin Pliem & Lucas Gehrmann, Eva Schlegel & Carl Pruscha, Rudi Stanzel & Andrea Schurian, Viktoria Tremmel & Kurt Kladler, Hana Usui & Marcello Farabegoli. Curated and produced by Marcello Farabegoli and Lucas Gehrmann.
- 2017, Czech-Italian art symposium & exhibition at Galerie Miroslava Kubika in Litomysl (CZ) with Alessandra Draghi, Chiara Giorgetti, Radim Langer, Virginia Dal Magro, Cristiano Rizzo, Vladimir Skrepl, and Viktorie Valocka. Curated by Richard Adam and Marcello Farabegoli.
- 2017, Italian embassy - Palais Metternich Vienna: exhibition Domenica with Pablo Chiereghin, Aldo Giannotti and Massimo Vitali inaugurated by Giorgio Marrapodi, Italian ambassador, Stella Rollig, general director of Österreichische Galerie Belvedere, Ivica Vastić, Austrian football legend, and Marcello Farabegoli, curator and producer of the exhibition.
- 2016, special project of the Vienna Art Week at Studio Kucsko: exhibition The Beauty of Intellectual Property by Guido Kucsko curated by Marcello Farabegoli.
- 2016, section project statements of Parallel Vienna: exhibition Border Crossing with Pablo Chiereghin, Guido Kucsko, Esther Stocker and Hana Usui curated by Marcello Farabegoli.
- 2016, Italian embassy - Palais Metternich Vienna: exhibition Geometries by Esther Stocker inaugurated by Giorgio Marrapodi, Italian ambassador, Meinhard Rauchensteiner, adviser for science, art and culture of the President of Austria, Christoph Thun-Hohenstein, general director of MAK–Austrian Museum of Applied Arts/Contemporary Art, and Marcello Farabegoli, curator and producer of the exhibition.
- 2016, GPLcontemporary Vienna: exhibition 'Im Keller' im Keller by Ulrich Seidl; Intervention/action 'Scandalous pictures' by Pablo Chiereghin, artist, Andrea Hubin, research assistant at Kunsthalle Wien, and Karin Schneider, art historian and art educator. Curated by Marcello Farabegoli.
- 2015, special project of the Vienna Art Week at KunstHausWien / Museum Hundertwasser: exhibition Perpetuum Mobile with Flavia Bigi, Pablo Chiereghin, Fanni Futterknecht, Gianmaria Gava in collaboration with Anke Armandi & Agnes Peschta, Aiko Kazuko Kurosaki, Sissa Micheli, Linus Riepler, and Hana Usui curated by Marcello Farabegoli.
- 2015, Bildraum 01, Salon M & Viennafair in Vienna: exhibition-cycle Black Rain by Hana Usui; round table about Hiroshima and the atomic bomb with Georg Pöstinger, Minister for disarmament and non-proliferation – The Austrian Foreign Ministry, Nadja Schmidt, executive director ICAN Austria – International Campaign to Abolish Nuclear Weapons, Wolfgang Liebert, head of the Institute of Safety/Security and Risk Sciences at BOKU (University of Natural Resources and Life Sciences, Vienna), Marcello Farabegoli, curator of the exhibition-cycle / moderated by Judith Brandner, publicist and journalist at Ö1.
- 2015, Italian embassy - Palais Metternich Vienna: exhibition Dance of Diplomacy - Transpositions by Sissa Micheli inaugurated by Giorgio Marrapodi, Italian ambassador, Manfred Matzka, secretary general of the Federal Chancellor Office representing Josef Ostermayer, Austrian Minister for Culture, Peter Bogner, director of the Friedrich Kiesler Foundation, and Marcello Farabegoli, curator and producer of the exhibition.
- 2014, special Project of the Vienna Art Week at Verein 08: exhibition No more Fukushimas with casaluce/geiger & Hana Usui, Julius Deutschbauer & Gabriel Schöller, Luca Faccio, Olga Georgieva, Shinshu Hida, Edgar Honetschläger & Sylvia Eckermann, Sissa Micheli, Takashi Ohno, Atsuko Otsuka, Federico Vecchi, and Erwin Wurm; Round table about nuclear energy with Judith Brandner, publicist and journalist at Ö1, Lucas Gehrmann, curator at Kunsthalle Wien, Wolfgang Liebert, head of the Institute of Safety/Security and Risk Sciences at BOKU (University of Natural Resources and Life Sciences, Vienna), Patricia Lorenz, anti-nuclear campaigner GLOBAL 2000 – Friends of the Earth Austria, and Marcus Rennhofer, photovoltaic expert at AIT (Austrian Institute of Technology) / moderated by Tristan Jorde, actor. Curated and produced by Marcello Farabegoli.
- 2014, Salotto.Vienna (Viennese Art Salon) at ex Pescheria – Salone degli Incanti in Trieste (IT): Presented by MAK – Austrian Museum of Applied Arts / Contemporary Art; curated and produced by Jürgen F. Weishäupl; co-curated by Giovanni Damiani, Marcello Farabegoli and Giulio Polita; Viennese institutions represented: 21er Haus – Österreichische Galerie Belvedere, Akademie des Österreichischen Films, Haus der Musik, ImPulsTanz, Kunsthalle Wien, KunstHausWien – Museum Hundertwasser, KÖR – Kunst im Öffentlichen Raum Wien, Leopold Museum, MQ – MuseumsQuartier, ORF RadioKulturhaus & Ö1, sound:frame, TQW – Tanzquartier Wien, University of Applied Arts Vienna, Wien Modern, Wiener Stadthalle and many more; Personalities taking part included Gerald Bast, Nin Brudermann, casaluce/geiger, Victoria Coeln, Salvo Cuccia, Stephanie Cumming, Johannes Deutsch, Julius Deutschbauer, Paul Divjak, Christoph Dostal, Thomas Draschan, VALIE EXPORT, Luca Faccio, Eva Fischer, Andreas Fogarasi, Lucas Gehrmann, Aldo Giannotti, Sara Glaxia, Manuel Gras, Chris Haring, Daniel Hoesl, Edgar Honetschläger, Thomas Jakoubek, Erwin Kiennast, Anna Kohlweis, Gregor Koller, Peter Koger, Reanne Leuning, liquidloft, Marko Lulic, Gerald Matt, Anja Manfredi, Sissa Micheli, Rita Nowak, Phace | contemporary music, Pianodrum, Karin Pliem, Davide Rampello, Patrick Rampelotto, Veronika Ratzenböck, Meinhard Rauchensteiner, Karl Regensburger, Eva Schlegel, Lorenz Seidler, Julia Starsky, Christoph Thun-Hohenstein, Spencer Tunick, Katarszyna Unszynska, Hana Usui, Viktor Vanicek, Federico Vecchi, Vignette Coquette – Opera Burlesque, Walking-Chair Design Studio, Peter Weinhäupl, Nives Widauer, Thomas Wohinz, Erwin Wurm, Luisa Ziaja, and many more.
- 2013, special project of the Vienna Art Week at Kunsthalle Wien Museumsquartier: Show by Berlin's legendary Club der polnischen Versager (Club of Polish Failures) produced by Marcello Farabegoli.
- 2012, special project of the Vienna Art Week at Kunsthalle Wien Karlsplatz: presentation of catalogue Hana Usui – Drawings on paper 2006-2012 by Eugenio d'Auria, Italian ambassador, and Monika Knofler, director of the Graphic Collection of the Academy of Fine Arts Vienna. Editor and producer of the event: Marcello Farabegoli.
- 2008, Galerie oko – Japanese Contemporary Art in Berlin: exhibition Murder of Oiran in Blood by Ushio Shinohara inaugurated by Antje Papist-Matsuo, research assistant at Kunsthistorisches Institut der Freien Universität Berlin, Hainz Stahlhut, director of the Fine Art Collection at the Berlinische Galerie - Berlin's State Museum of Modern Art, Photography & Architecture, and Marcello Farabegoli, director of Galerie oko.
- 2007, Galerie oko – Japanese Contemporary Art & Club der polnischen Versager (Club of Polish Failures) in Berlin: reading by Yoko Tawada produced by Marcello Farabegoli.
- 2006, Neue Nationalgalerie (New National Gallery) in Berlin: performance Don Giovanni by Marcello Farabegoli with the Club der polnischen Versager (Club of Polish Failures) for the Salon Noir during the exhibition Melancholie. Genie und Wahnsinn in der Kunst.
