= Mori Art Museum =

Contemporary art museum in Tokyo, Japan

Coordinates: 35°39′37.82″N 139°43′44.64″E

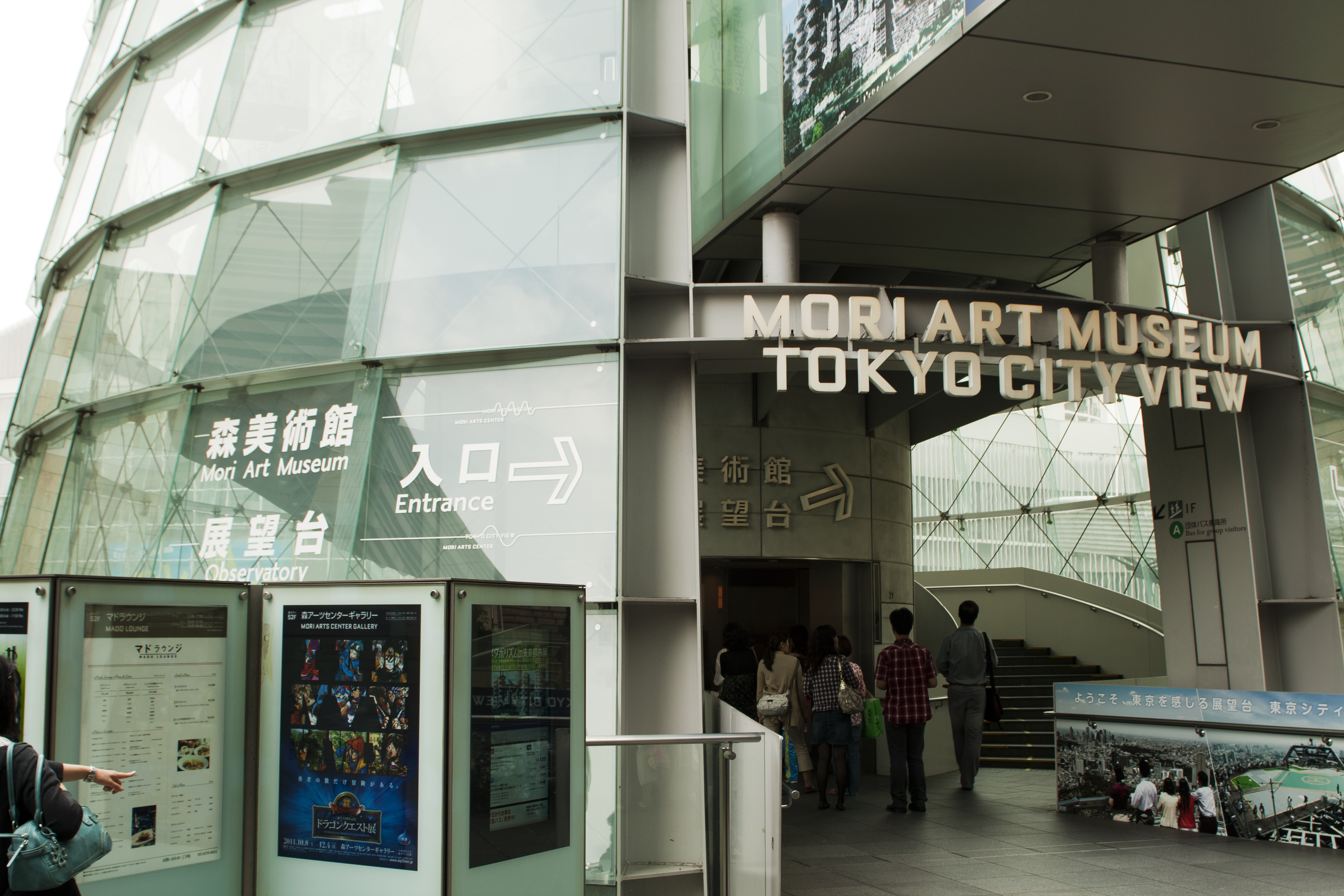
The Mori Art Museum

The Mori Art Museum (森美術館, Mori Bijutsukan) is a contemporary art museum founded by the real estate developer Minoru Mori. It is located in the Roppongi Hills Mori Tower in the Roppongi Hills complex, a commercial, cultural, and residential mega-complex in Tokyo, Japan. The museum's primary focus is large-scale international exhibitions of contemporary art, though it also has a permanent collection of art from Japan and the wider Asia Pacific region.

The museum was founded and developed based on Mori's belief that "culture shapes a city's identity," and as a result offers varied programming that works to cater to a wide-ranging and diverse audience, "from children to older adults, and from locals to international visitors." In 2015, the museum underwent major renovations, and simultaneously revised its mission statement in an effort to reflect the expansion and changing landscape of the 'Global art' scene in the previous decade. At the same time, the museum introduced several new program series to supplement the existing rotation of internationally contemporary-themed exhibitions: MAM Collection, MAM Screen, and MAM Research.

Since opening in 2003, the Mori Art Museum has held exhibitions featuring a number of internationally renowned artists from Japan and beyond, including Yayoi Kusama, Ai Weiwei, Bill Viola, Cao Fei, Anish Kapoor, and Jeff Koons. Today, MAM is one of Tokyo's most popular art museums, and in 2018 had brought in 13.5 million visitors from around the world.

== History ==
The Mori Art Museum was founded in 2003 as part of the much larger Roppongi Hills, a development project that sought to integrate work, leisure and living spaces into one mega complex. This project was the brainchild of Minoru Mori, an influential business tycoon, who had been developing Roppongi Hills for 17 years prior to its opening. He envisioned this metropolitan complex as a step toward a utopia in which commuting times would be shortened and more time could be devoted to family, community, and leisure time, with a particular focus on cultural pursuits.

At the center of this project was Mori Tower, on top of which Mori established the Mori Art Museum as a reflection of his societal vision. In a statement on the museum, Mori wrote:

The MAM strives to be a place for enjoyment, stimulation, and discussion — a place where what is important in our culture and society is open debated, not only through the exhibitions that are shown there but also through a wide range of learning programs.

The first director of Mori Art Museum was David Elliott (2003-2006), followed by Fumio Nanjo (2006-2019). At the end of 2019, chief curator Mami Kataoka was announced as the successor to Fumio Nanjo.

In 2015, three years after Minoru Mori's death, MAM underwent significant renovations, after which new programming was introduced to supplement its existing rotation of largescale exhibitions. It has since been praised for the wide and multi-faceted appeal of its exhibitions, which Condé Nast Traveler described as "as thought-provoking as they are instagrammable." The museum is singular among major museums in Tokyo for its late opening hours, part of its effort to make arts and culture accessible and enjoyable to the wider public. In 2018, visitors after 5 p.m. accounted for 30 percent of the museum's overall visitorship.

== Museum Layout ==
The Mori Art Museum is located on the 53rd and 54th floors at the top of Mori Tower in Roppongi Hills. It is part of the Mori Arts Center, which includes Tokyo Center View (a rooftop observatory deck), the Mori Arts Center Gallery, a Museum Shop, and a Museum Cafe & Restaurant.

Visitors enter the museum on the 2nd floor of Roppongi Hills Mori Tower through the "Museum Cone," an elliptically shaped structure that encircles a high speed elevator that visitors can take to the 52nd floor (which houses the Mori Art Center Gallery, the Tokyo City view shop, and the restaurant) and the 53rd floor (home to the Mori Art Museum). The latter floor serves as the museum's primary exhibition space, and also includes an auditorium and additional shop. The museum galleries themselves are also arranged in an elliptical formation, with a set of stairs to going up to the Sky Deck in the center of the floor.

== Exhibitions ==
The museum's first major exhibition was 'Happiness: A Survival Guide for Art and Life', co-curated by guest curator Pier Luigi Tazzi and David Elliot. The show featured the works of globally renowned artists such as Anish Kapoor, Heri Dono, Jeong So-yoon, and Jeff Koons, combining contemporary installation, sculpture, and paintings with pieces of classic Asian art, primarily from Japan and China. This selection created a massive blockbuster of an exhibition that sought to illustrate Mori and Elliott's aim to create an international and modern metropolis of "'artintelligence'" (a term from Mori) within the museum's walls. In the exhibition catalogue, Elliott explained the connection between the concept of happiness and the art from the exhibition. He writes, "Art presents us with an open field in which we may contemplate, without boundaries or prejudice, what is really important to us."

Further demonstrating its ambitions for a wide-ranging international scope that would also promote contemporary art and design from within Japan, the museum collaborated with the Museum of Modern Art, New York in 2004 for 'Roppongi Crossing: New Visions in Japanese Art 2004'. This exhibition featured examples of contemporary of East Asian (primarily Japanese) art, architecture, and design, exploring how these genres intersected and interacted to become an "indispensable part of everyday life."

In 2017, MAM collaborated with the National Art Center in Tokyo to put on 'Sunshower: Contemporary Art from Southeast Asia, 1980s to Now'. Billed as the "largest-ever" exhibition of contemporary Southeast Asian art, the show comprised around 190 works by eighty-six artists exhibited across the two sites for three and a half months. The exhibition also traveled, in a slightly condensed form, to the Kaohsiung Museum of Fine Arts in Taiwan.

== Collection ==
MAM continues to place greater focus on its temporary blockbuster exhibitions, bringing in a range of works by internationally-known artists on a regular basis, however, it also has a permanent collection that comprises around 460 works (as of January 2023) and largely consists of avant-garde and contemporary pieces from Japan and other parts of East Asia. From 2015, the museum introduced a new project called "MAM Collection," which works to expand the museum's existing collection and curate smaller exhibitions showcasing its highlights in a small gallery next to the museum book store.

=== Selected List of Artists ===
- Ai Weiwei
- Makoto Aida
- Jananne Al-Ani
- Tarek Al-Ghoussein
- Poklong Anading
- Cao Fei
- Chim↑Pom
- Gohar Dashti
- Shilpa Gupta
- Laurent Grasso
- Ho Tzu Nyen
- Mako Idemitsu
- Takahiro Iwasaki
- Mari Katayama
- Tsubasa Kato
- Yayoi Kusama
- Dinh Q. Lê
- Lee Bul
- Lee Wen
- Fuyuko Matsui
- Prabhavathi Meppayil
- Futoshi Miyagi
- Ryuji Miyamoto
- Mariko Mori
- Jun Nguyen-Hatsushiba
- Yoshinori Niwa
- Yoko Ono
- Jagannath Panda
- Po Po
- Araya Rasdjarmrearnsook
- Koki Tanaka
- Rodel Tapaya
- Tromarama
- Tsai Charwei
- Vandy Rattana
- Wang Qingsong
- Chikako Yamashiro
- Miwa Yanagi
- Haegue Yang
- Yee I-Lann
- Yin Xiuzhen
- Shizuka Yokomizo
- Zhang O
- Zhou Tiehai

== Publications ==
The museum has published a number of books about its collection and special exhibitions.

== See also ==
- 21st Century Museum of Contemporary Art, Kanazawa
- Museum of Contemporary Art, Tokyo
- National Museum of Modern Art, Tokyo
- Sogetsu Art Center
- Tokyo Metropolitan Art Museum
