= Yokomizo =

Yokomizo (written: 横溝) is a Japanese surname. Notable people with the surname include:

- Naoki Yokomizo (横溝 直輝, born 1980), Japanese racing driver
- Saburo Yokomizo (横溝 三郎, born 1939), Japanese middle-distance runner
- Seishi Yokomizo (横溝 正史, 1902–1981), Japanese writer
- Shizuka Yokomizo (横溝 静, born 1966), Japanese photographer
- Yuri Yokomizo, Japanese illustrator and graphic designer
