= Dday One =

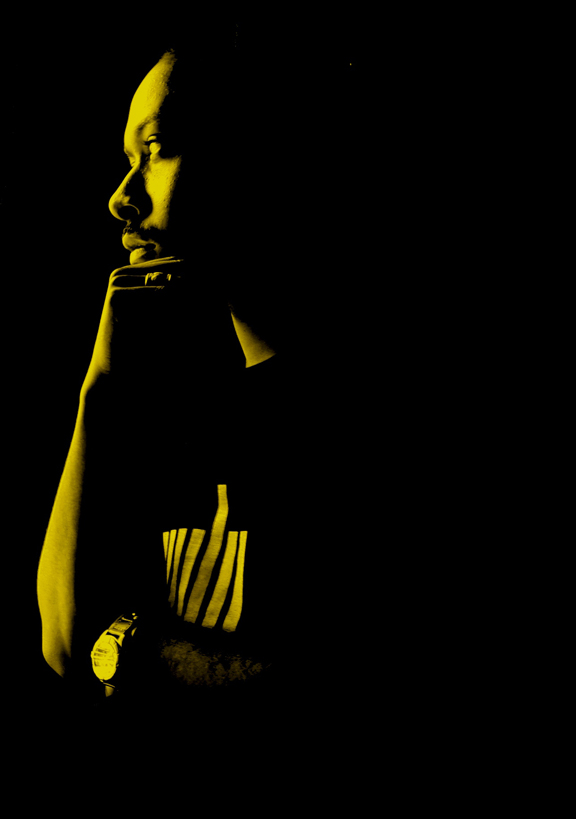

Background information
- Also known as: Dday One
- Born: Udeze Ukwuoma
- Origin: Los Angeles, California
- Genres: Instrumental hip hop; electroacoustic; electronica; hip hop
- Occupation(s): Producer; DJ; Photographer; Record Label Owner
- Instrument(s): Sampler; Turntables; Drum machine
- Years active: 1996–present
- Labels: P-Vine; Project Mooncircle; Content Label
- Website: ddayone.com

Dday One (born Udeze Ukwuoma) is an American music producer, DJ and songwriter, from Los Angeles, California. He is known for his instrumental sample-based productions which incorporate the extensive use of Break-Beats and organic sounds with emotional elements. Using the Sampler as his sole instrument and mainly drawing from nature, Free jazz and World music, his compositional process is rooted in the lineages of classic hip hop production and Electro-Acoustic music.

He has released projects on various labels but the bulk of his output has been through Content (L)abel, a label which he founded and functions as artistic director, creating a majority of the cover art photography.

== Live performances ==
Throughout the years, Dday One has performed worldwide, sharing the stage with the likes of Kid Koala, Olive Oil, Yppah, Hisham Bharoocha and many more. Distinct from many contemporary electronic performers, Dday One's performances do not rely heavily on the use of a laptop with performance software. Alternatively, his setup is similar to the classic hip hop studio, consisting of a turntable, mixer, effects module and a hardware sampler. Primarily with the use of the Roland MV-8000 sampler in conjunction with the Korg mini-KP, he mixes various musical styles with elements of his own compositions while improvising and drumming out the percussive parts in real time.

=== Notable venues ===
- Liquid Loft – Tokyo, Japan (2009)
- Power House Arena – Brooklyn, New York (2009)
- Agnes b (Headquarters)- Paris, France (2010)

== Podcast ==
In addition to production, he is also a contributing Host / DJ for Rhythm Incursions; a Podcast syndicated by London's Resonance 104.4FM. The podcast consists of themed mixes under the title "In Session".

== Discography ==
=== Albums ===
- Loop Extensions (2005, Content Label / Needlework UK)
- Heavy Migration (2008, Content Label / P-Vine)
- Loop Extensions Deluxe (2011, Content Label / P-Vine)
- Mood Algorithms (2011, Content Label / P-Vine)
- Dialogue with Life (2014, Content Label / P-Vine)
- Gathered Between (2016, Content Label / Needlework UK)
- Manu Propria (2022, Content Label / Needlework UK)
- Orchestrated Energy: A Collection of Early and Unreleased Works (2025, Content Label / SAMPLIST (ASCAP))

=== EPs ===
- Dday One / Dextah – Sense of Balance / Untitled No. 541 (2006, Content Label)
- Journal (2009, Content Label)
- Dday One / Glen Porter – Wavelengths (2010, Content Label)
- Mr. Cooper / Dday One – Tribute to the Q4 (2010, Project Mooncircle)

=== Mixes ===
- Made From Scratch (mix-tape) (1996)
- Air Force Crew Meets The Revolvers (w/DJ Blue)(mix-tape) (1999)
- The Stems of Hip Hop (mix-tape) (2000)
- Blend Meditation (2006)
- These Are My Beats (Mega-Mix) (2006)
- Blend Meditation 2 (2009)
- Rhythm Incursions Podcast (In Session with Dday One) (2010)

=== Appears on ===
- The Offbeaters – The Promotion-Assault (2003, Subversiv*rec)
- Various – Offbeats 2.0 (2005, Subversiv*rec)
- Various – Tropiczone Swap (2006, Twentyfour:Seven Records )
- Various – The Heart on the Right Spot (2007, Project Mooncircle )
- Various – Signal Path (2007, Content Label )
- Various – In The First Place, Does Digital Harinezumi Dream (2009, Power Shovel Audio )
- Various – Project Mooncircle 10TH ANNIVERSARY COMPILATION (2012, Project Mooncircle)
- 2econd Class Citizen – Outside Your Doorway EP (2012, Equinox Records)
