= Rumpistol =

Danish producer and musician

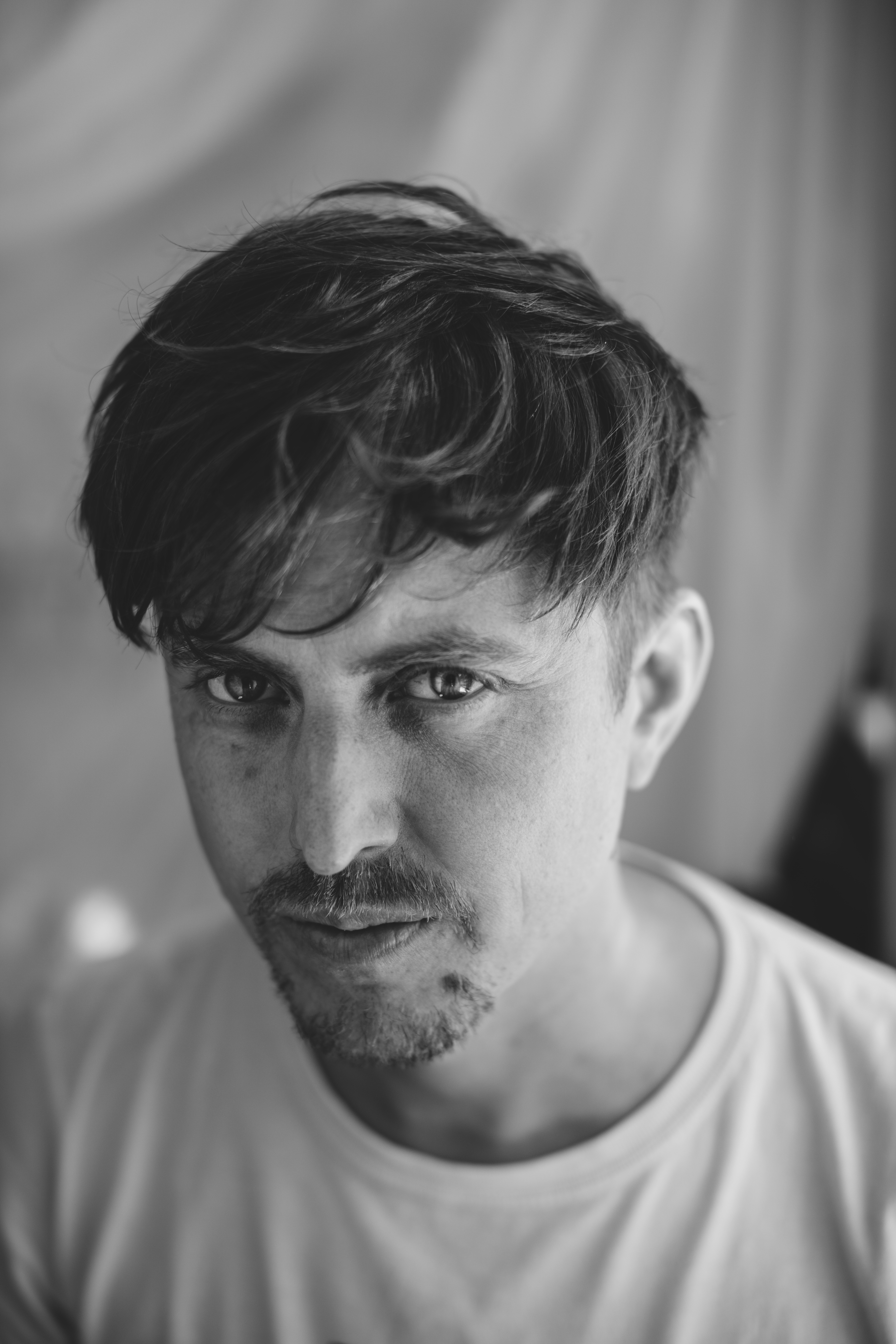
Rumpistol in 2019

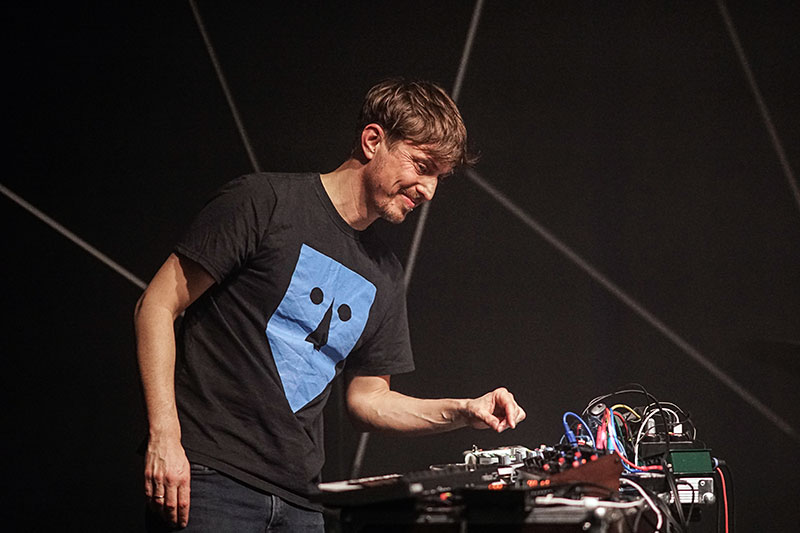
Aarhus, Denmark (2019)

Jens Berents Christiansen (born in 1978), also known as Rumpistol, is a Danish producer and musician, who writes and performs electronic music. He has been releasing music since 2003 and has received positive reviews from magazines such as Intro.de De:Bug and Danish magazine GAFFA. The latter gave Rumpistol 6/6 for his 2008 album Dynamo.

Rumpistol creates music ranging from neoclassical music to electronic music in the electronica-genre with inspiration from ambient, dub, IDM, techno and dubstep, made for both the dance floor and for sitting audiences.

Christiansen also plays keyboards and produces for the band Kalaha and has produced or contributed to releases from Lukkif and collaborating with artists like Baiana System (BZ), Efterklang, Blue Foundation and Indians.

In 2019 Kalaha won Carl Prisen in the category Best Roots Composer (for the EP Mama Ngoma). In 2016 Christiansen co-wrote and co-produced the album Masala which won a Danish Music Award Jazz for Best Special release and was also nominated for Carl Prisen in 2018. In 2016 his music was used for the opening ceremony for the Paralympics in Rio de Janeiro. Rumpistol has played live at Roskilde Festival (DK) in 2006 and 2009, at MUTEK Montréal (CAN) in 2012, at Multiplicidade (BZ) in 2015 at Boiler Room UK in 2012.

Rumpistol has released on several labels including his own label Rump Recordings, The Rust Music, Øen Records, Project: Mooncircle and Iboga Records.

== Selected discography ==
=== Studio Albums by Rumpistol ===
Title	Label	Year
Rumpistol	Rump Recordings	2003
Mere Rum	Rump Recordings	2005
Dynamo	Rump Recordings	2008
Floating feat. Red Baron	Project Mooncircle	2012
Floating Remixes feat. Red Baron	Rump Recordings	2013
Away	Rump Recordings	2014
Eyes Open Wide Rmxs	Iboga Records	2016
After The Flood	Øen Records	2020
Isola	Raske Plader	2022

=== Singles & EPs by Rumpistol ===
Title	Label	Year
Copenhagen Jazz feat. Splitbeat	Auditory Designs	2004
Talk To You	Rump Recordings	2011
It's Everywhere feat. John LaMonica	Rump Recordings	2013
Asleep	Rump Recordings	2013
Away Rmxs	Rump Recordings	2014
Eyes Open Wide	Rump Recordings	2016
Drops	Rump Recordings	2017
Drops Remixes	Rump Recordings	2018
In My Room	The Rust Music	2019
(There is no) There There	Øen Records	2020
Aurolac	Øen Records	2020
Løvfald	Raske Plader	2021
Vindheks	Raske Plader	2022
Gniben	Raske Plader	2022
New Beginning (Collaboration w. Kill J)	Raske Plader	2022

=== Albums by Kalaha ===
Title	Label	Format	Year
Hahaha	Rump Recordings	Digital Album	2014
Masala	Rump Recordings	Vinyl & Digital Album	2016
Masala – Extra Spicy	Rump Recordings	Vinyl & Digital Album	2018
Mandala	DME	Vinyl & Digital Album	2019
Mystafa	April Records	Vinyl, CD & Digital Album	2021

=== Singles & EPs by Kalaha ===
Title	Label	Format	Year
Quarquaba	Rump Recordings	Digital EP	2016
Wahwahwah	Rump Recordings	Digital EP	2016
Dragon Jenny (Extended Version)	Rump Recordings	Digital Single	2018
Mama Ngoma	Rump Recordings	Digital EP	2018
Çok Küstüm feat. Hilal Kaya	DME	Digital Single	2019
Eymen feat. Hilal Kaya	DME	Digital Single	2019
Eymen feat. Hilal Kaya (Junglelyd & Merlyn Silva remix feat. Huaynot)	Sofa Beats	Digital Single	2019
Dans Det Op feat. Uffe Lorenzen / Eymen feat. Hilal Kaya	April Records	7" Vinyl	2020
Vivo	April Records	Digital Single	2020
Özgürüm Ben feat. Hilal Kaya	April Records	Digital Single	2020
Hurt You Once Again feat. Hjalte Ross	April Records	Digital Single	2021

=== Remixes by Rumpistol ===
Artist	Title	Label	Year
Magtværk	Rumpistol meets Freja in Dub	MVR	2004
Analogik	So Many Musicians (Rumpistol Meets Analogiks Many Musicians)	Auditory Designs	2005
Acustic	T.P.Ø. (Rumpistol Remix)	RKRLHJ	2006
.tape.	Late, Vague, Wrong (Rumpistol Remix)	spa.RK	2008
Keramick & Lobo	Answers (Rumpistol Remix)	Freaky Beats Productions	2010
Efterklang	Modern Drift (Rumpistol Remix)	Flow Records	2010
System	Alpha (Rumpistol Remix)	Rump Recordings	2011
Blue Foundation	Hoshi No Tame No Kmoruta (Rumpistol Rmx)	Dead People's Choice	2012
Indians	Magic Kids (Rumpistol Remix)	4AD	2013
Cirkular	Girl (Rumpistol Remix)	Pattern Abuse	2016
Rumpistol	Swing Drops (Rumpistol Ambient Remix)	Rump Recordings	2018
Roel Funcken	Bloid Fraxton (Rumpistol Remix)	Touched Music	2018
IKI	Reflex (Rumpistol Remix)	DME	2020

== Career ==
After starting his career playing keyboard and guitar for the band Magtværk, Christiansen moved on to launch his solo career as Rumpistol in 2003.
