= Yee I-Lann =

Malaysian artist

- Born: 1971 (age 54–55); Kota Kinabalu, Malaysia
- Education: University of South Australia; Central Saint Martins
- Known for: Photography, collage, film, weaving
- Movement: Contemporary art
- Website: https://borneoheart.yeeilann.com/

Yee I-Lann (born 1971) is a Malaysian contemporary artist known for her works using photography, collage, film, collaborative weaving, and everyday objects. Her practice examines power, colonialism, and neocolonialism in Southeast Asia to explore the impact of historic memory on social experience. Since 2018, Yee has been working collaboratively with sea-based and land-based indigenous communities in Sabah, Malaysia. Yee currently lives and works in Kota Kinabalu, Sabah, Malaysia.

Yee has exhibited in museums across Asia, Europe, the United States, and Australia, including solo exhibitions such as Yee I-Lann: Until We Hug Again (2021) at the Centre for Heritage Arts & Textile in Hong Kong, Fluid World (2011) at the Contemporary Art Centre of South Australia, Adelaide, and Yee I-Lann: 2005–2016 (2016) at the Ayala Museum, Manila, the Philippines. She has participated in the Yinchuan Biennale (2016), the Asia Pacific Triennial (2015, 1999), the Jakarta Biennale (2015), the Singapore Biennale (2013, 2006), and the Fukuoka Asian Art Triennale (2009).

During the 1990s, Yee was co-founder of the art collective, labDNA. She shares KerbauWorks, a cross-discipline project label and space, with her partner, the musician and designer Joe Kidd. Yee is a board member for Forever Sabah based in Sabah, and a co-founding partner of Kota-K Studio, an exhibition space and cross-disciplinary platform for art and architecture in Tanjung Aru Old Town, Kota Kinabalu.

== Early life and education ==
Yee was born in 1971 in Kota Kinabalu, Sabah, Malaysia, to Datin Amy-Jean Yee (née Gracey; born 9 June 1945), a retired schoolteacher who is from New Zealand of Pākehā ancestry as well as Scots descent (with Scottish American roots in the state of Nebraska), the daughter of a Scottish-American serviceman who was posted in New Zealand during the Second World War, Dean Simms Gracey (1915 – 2008) and a retired civil servant father, Datuk Stanislaus Yee Fong Chun (1940 – 27 September 2025) who is a Sino-Kadazan-Murut, an indigenous ethnic group of Sabah, albeit of partial mixed Hakka Chinese descent who hailed from suburban Penampang as well as the interior Tenom districts.

In the early 1990s, Yee left Malaysia for studies at the University of South Australia, Adelaide, obtaining a BA in Visual Art with a major in photography and a minor in cinematography. After graduating, she began travelling across Europe from 1993, visiting cities in Italy. She subsequently moved to London for a summer course in painting at the Central Saint Martins College of Art and Design.

== Career ==
=== labDNA collective ===
In 1994, Yee returned to Kuala Lumpur, Malaysia, finding work as a production assistant at a production house, soon becoming a production designer for feature films. Yee also worked part-time as a paparazzo, shooting scenes of Kuala Lumpur's nightlife for ETC. Magazine. At the Annexe Wing of the Central Market Building in Kuala Lumpur, Yee's long-term collaborator Nani Kahar set up the architecture firm, DNA Studio, becoming a play space that gave rise to labDNA, a collective consisting of Yee, Nani Kahar, and media design lecturer Colleen Macklin. The collective explored the question of how a city that was constantly undergoing change could be used by the young.

labDNA hosted a series of creative happenings with different collaborators across the city. In 1996, they organised To Catch A Cloud at the National Planetarium of Malaysia, a multimedia theatre event telling the story of "a young boy whose dream is to catch a cloud of his own". Following To Catch A Cloud, subsequent projects held between July and October 1997 saw the use of rave music as a means of transforming one's experience to space and other bodies. For these projects, labDNA collaborated with architects to create immersive installations around which performance artworks could be staged. The first was Suburbia Panics, held at a colonial bungalow turned restaurant The Kapitan's Club, followed by Urban Paranoia on the rooftop of a corporate building, Menara IMC. The series culminated in Blue Skies, a party held at a former colonial prison, Pudu Prison, which was slated for demolishment. Though more established figures in the English-speaking Malaysian art scene protested against what they perceived as the frivolous use of a space burdened with history, labDNA went ahead with the event, with Yee and Nani Kahar responding that while they were not qualified to address spirits, they were qualified to address urban youth. After the conclusion of Blue Skies, the labDNA team, shaken by the controversy, decided to take a break.

=== Film and individual art practice ===
From 1998 to 2002, Yee focussed on production design in film productions, with few explorations in contemporary art, such as with her appearance at the 1999 Asia Pacific Triennial in Queensland, Australia. Following this renewed connection with Australia, Yee developed her Horizon series in 2003 during a residency in Sydney. Yee would exhibit the series at her first solo show at a commercial gallery in Kuala Lumpur, marking the start of her career as a professional artist.

Between 2003 and 2008, Yee lectured at Akademi Seni Budaya dan Warisan Kebangsaan (ASWARA), establishing the production design department. She would continue to exhibit internationally, such as at the Singapore Biennale in 2006 and the Fukuoka Asian Art Triennale in 2009.

In a 2013 photocollage series titled Picturing Power, Yee mixed colonial-era and contemporary images to suggest a Malaysian present still dictated by an unresolved colonial history. In 2013, she also served as a member of the curatorial team for the fourth Singapore Biennale, If The World Changed.

Her 2016 exhibition, Like the Banana Tree at the Gate, took inspiration from two motifs iconic in Malaysia and throughout Southeast Asia: the ubiquitous banana tree; and the pontianak, a vengeful female spirit with long black hair who is sometimes said to reside in that plant. Through a series of digital photocollage works and a three-channel video work, Yee evoked the potency of a feminine power derived from local knowledge and folkloric traditions.

In 2017 she was featured in the major group exhibition, SUNSHOWER, Contemporary Art from Southeast Asia 1980s to Now, jointly hosted by the Mori Art Museum and National Art Center in Tokyo, Japan.

=== Collaborative weaving ===
Since 2018, Yee has been based Kota Kinabalu, collaborating with indigenous weavers across Sabah to make tikar (woven mats). These collaborations are with the inland community, Sabahan Dusun and Murut weavers in the Keningau interior, and the sea community, Bajau Sama Dilaut weavers from Pulau Omadal, Semporna. These craft communities in the mountains and plains of Borneo are usually bound to the tourist market, and such collaborations have led a sea village community on the border between the Sulu and Celebes Seas to turn from fishing to weaving, reducing pressure on the Coral Triangle. In the context of these collaborations, the woven mat is seen as a local, egalitarian, democratic, and feminist platform; a shared experience of intimacy tied to everyday life and ritual.
