= Project Mooncircle =

Independent record label

- Founded: 2002
- Founder: Gordon Gieseking
- Genre: Experimental hip hop, electronic, Electronica, Folk Music, Jazz, Drum and Bass, Breakbeat, Instrumental, Downtempo, Deep House, Techno, UK Garage
- Country of origin: Germany
- Location: Berlin
- Official website: projectmooncircle.com

Project Mooncircle is an independent record label based in Berlin, Germany, focusing on organic and electronic music.

== History ==
Project Mooncircle was founded in 2002 by Gordon Gieseking, as an offshoot of experimental electronic Miami label Beta Bodega. In 2004 Gieseking formed a partnership with the vinyl and clothing mail-order company Hip Hop Vinyl, and when Beta Bodega ceased operations in 2005, Project Mooncircle became HHV.DE's official imprint. Respectively in 2009 and 2010, Project Mooncircle took up two sub-labels, dub techno imprint Project Squared and blog/label Finest Ego, and in 2014 it was featured in the XLR8R readers poll on the best independent record labels, behind Ninja Tune and Warp Records.

== Alumni / current artists ==
- 1000 Names
- 40 Winks
- Barnaby Carter
- Barrio Lindo
- Blossom
- CYNE
- Daisuke Tanabe
- Daixie
- Darius Vaikas
- DDay One
- Deceptikon
- Deft
- Disc System meets Inner Science
- DZA
- Erik Luebs
- Empt
- Fat Jon The Ample Soul Physician
- Flako
- Glen Porter
- Good Paul
- Graciela Maria
- Groeni
- Hanami
- IIIII (Five Eyes)
- Jahbitat
- Jilk
- Joe Kickass
- John Lamonica
- John Robinson
- Kidkanevil
- KRTS
- Kwala
- Lambent
- Lewis Parker
- Lomovolokno
- Long arm
- Maneuvers
- Mathematik
- Mau'lin
- memotone
- Michal Lewicki
- Mike Gao
- Monsoonsiren
- Mr Cooper
- My Panda Shall Fly
- Non Genetic Of Shadow Huntaz
- Nuage
- Obba Supa aka Teknical Development & Hey!zeus
- Olof Melander
- Parra For Cuva
- Pavel Dovgal
- The Q4 – The Quadraphonic Quartet.
- Rain Dog
- The Range
- Red Baron
- Robot Koch
- Rumpistol
- Sekuoia
- Senoy
- Sieren
- Shahmen
- Soosh
- Strand
- Submerse
- Sweatson Klank
- Szenario
- Tendts
- Tom Diciccio
- Walrus Ghost
