= Kalaha (band) =

Danish band

Kalaha is a Danish electronic band that debuted in 2014. The bands artistic style takes inspiration from Afrobeat, Anatolian rock, electronic rave music, and jazz improvisation. Its members include drummer Emil De Waal, guitarist Niclas Knudsen, synthesizer player Rumpistol, and electronic producer Mikael Elkjær, also known as Spejderrobot.

Since their 2014 debut, Kalaha has been using Danish artist Zven Balslev as their art director. Balslev has also directed three of the bands music videos. Kalaha has collaborated with a wide range of artists from around the world including Hilal Kaya and Uffe Lorenzen of Spids Nøgenhat and Baby Woodrose.

== History ==
Kalaha's debut album, Hahaha, was released in 2014. The album was a live recording from their first show ever as a band. Their follow-up album Masala (2016) received a Danish Music Award for Jazz in the category "Special Release of the Year". It also received airplay by Gilles Peterson on BBC Radio 6 Music. Their third album Mandala (2019) was also well received by the critics and highlighted as album of the year in the Danish newspaper Information. The album featured the band's first Turkish song "Çok Küstüm", which became the beginning of a long time collaboration with the Turkish singer Hilal Kaya and also secured the band some attention in Turkey.

In 2019 they played a show together with American bass player Bill Laswell at Black Diamond during the Copenhagen Jazz Festival. In 2020 their single "Eymen" brought Kalaha a Danish Music Award nomination for Danish Roots Track of The Year and their single "Dans Det Op" featuring Uffe Lorenzen was nominated as "Song of the Year 2020" for the Danish Critics Award Steppeulven.

== Discography ==
=== Albums ===
Title	Label	Format	Year
Hahaha	Rump Recordings	Digital Album	2014
Masala	Rump Recordings	Vinyl & Digital Album	2016
Masala – Extra Spicy	Rump Recordings	Vinyl & Digital Album	2018
Mandala	DME	Vinyl & Digital Album	2019
Mystafa	April Records	Vinyl, CD & Digital Album	2021

=== Singles & EPs ===
Title	Label	Format	Year
Quarquaba	Rump Recordings	Digital EP	2016
Wahwahwah	Rump Recordings	Digital EP	2016
Dragon Jenny (Extended Version)	Rump Recordings	Digital Single	2018
Mama Ngoma	Rump Recordings	Digital EP	2018
Çok Küstüm feat. Hilal Kaya	DME	Digital Single	2019
Eymen feat. Hilal Kaya	DME	Digital Single	2019
Eymen feat. Hilal Kaya (Junglelyd & Merlyn Silva remix feat. Huaynot)	Sofa Beats	Digital Single	2019
Dans Det Op feat. Uffe Lorenzen / Eymen feat. Hilal Kaya	April Records	7" Vinyl	2020
Vivo	April Records	Digital Single	2020
Özgürüm Ben feat. Hilal Kaya	DME	Digital Single	2020
Hurt You Once Again feat. Hjalte Ross	April Records	Digital Single	2021

== Awards ==
Year	Award	Category	Result	Ref.
2017	Danish Music Awards	Jazz: Special Release of the Year for Masala	Won	
2017	Danish Music Awards	Danish World composer of the year for ‘’Quarquaba EP’	Nominated	
2019	Carl Prisen	Roots Composer of the Year for the EP "Mama Ngoma"	Won	
2020	Danish Music Awards	Danish Roots Track of the Year for "Eymen"	Nominated	
2021	Steppeulven	Track of the year for "Dans det op" featuring Uffe Lorentzen	Nominated	
