= Mara Mattuschka =

Austrian avant-garde filmmaker (born 1959)

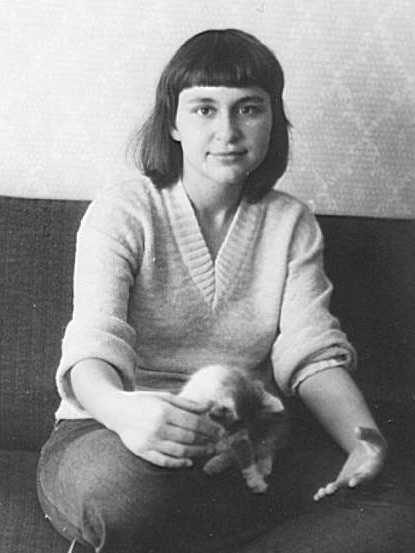
Mara Mattuschka, ca. 1980

Mara Mattuschka (born 22 May 1959) is an Austrian avant-garde filmmaker.

== Life ==
Mattuschka was born in Sofia in Bulgaria in 1959. At the age of 17, in 1976, she moved to Vienna to study Ethnology and Linguistics. In 1983, she entered Maria Lassnig's masterclass in animation and painting at the University of Applied Arts Vienna and started making her first short films. Her graduation film Der Einzug des Rokoko ins Inselreich der Huzis caused a small scandal at the university in 1989, because it mixed animation, theatre, performance, music and fine arts. She graduated in 1990. From 1997 until 2001 she taught arts at Braunschweig University of Art in Germany. She also taught at University of Art and Design Linz.

In the 2000s she started working with the dance ensemble Liquid Loft and Chris Haring. Her first feature film was made in 2012.

In 2006, the film festival Vienna Independent Shorts dedicated a retrospective to her work. Filmarchiv Austria showed a retrospective of her work for her 60th birthday in 2019.

She lives in Vienna.

== Style ==
In most of her films, she appears herself as her alter ego "Mimi Minus" and in various other identities.

== Filmography ==
- Nabelfabel (1984)
- Kugelkopf (1985)
- Der Untergang der Titania (1985)
- Cerolax II (1985)
- Die Schule der Ausschweifung (1986)
- Parasympathica (1986)
- Pascal - Gödel (1986)
- Kaiser Schnitt (1986)
- Es hat mich sehr gefreut (1987)
- Les Miserables (1987)
- Der Einzug des Rokoko ins Inselreich der Huzis (1989)
- Loading Ludwig (1989, with Michael Petrov)
- Der Schöne, die Biest (1993)
- S. O. S. Extraterrestria (1993)
- Suvlaki ist Babylon: Komm, iss mit mir (1995)
- Unternehmen Arschmaschine (1997, with Gabriele Szekatsch)
- Plasma (2004)
- Legal Errorist (2005, with Chris Haring)
- Königin der Nacht (Mozart Minute 20) (2006)
- Part Time Heroes (2007, with Chris Haring)
- Running Sushi (2008, with Chris Haring)
- Burning Palace (2009, with Chris Haring)
- Ovid Tum (2012, with Reinhard Jud)
- Perfect Garden (2013)
- Phaidros (2018)
