= Chris Haring =

Austrian dancer and choreographer

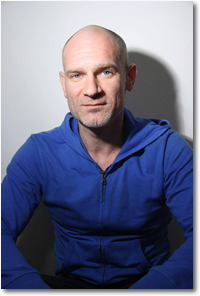

Christian Haring (born 18 December 1970, Schattendorf) is an Austrian dancer and choreographer. He is founder and artistic director of the dance company Liquid Loft.

== Life ==
Chris Haring studied at Universität für Musik und darstellende Kunst in Vienna and in New York, within others at Cunningham School. He worked as a dancer with compagnies like Nikolais/Luis Dance Cie. (US), man act (GB), Nigel Charnock (GB), DV8 Physical Theatre (GB), Cie. Willi Dorner (AT) and Pilottanzt (AT). For his own choreografies we worked with fine artists such as Erwin Wurm, Michel Blazy and Aldo Giannotti, musician Peter Rehberg or media artist Klaus Obermaier. Together with filmmaker Mara Mattuschka. he co-directed movies based on his performances.

Together with the musician Andreas Berger, dancer Stephanie Cumming and dramaturg Thomas J. Jelinek he founded the dance compagnie Liquid Loft in 2005.

== Choreographies ==
- D.A.V.E., 1999 (with Klaus Obermaier)
- Vivisector, 2002 (with Klaus Obermaier)
- Fremdkoerper, 2003
- Diese Körper, Diese Spielverderber, 2004
- Legal Errorist, 2004
- My Private Bodyshop, 2005
- Kind of Heroes, 2005
- Running Sushi, 2006
- Posing Project A – The Art of Wow, 2007
- Posing Project B – The Art of Seduction, 2007
- The China Project & Lovely Liquid Lounge, 2009 (with Jin Xing Dance Theatre)
- Sacre – The Rite Thing, 2010 (with Les Ballets de Monte-Carlo)
- Talking Head, 2010
- WELLNESS (The Perfect Garden), 2011
- Mush:Room (The Perfect Garden), 2012
- Groza, 2012 (with Dialogue Dance, Kostroma)
- Mush : Room (extended), 2012
- Grace Note, 2012 (with Phace Ensemble in the frame of Wien Modern)
- Deep Dish (The Perfect Garden), 2012
- LEGO LOVE, 2013 (with Staatstheater Kassel)
- Frozen Laugh, 2014 (with Ballett Moskau)
- Shiny, shiny… (Imploding Portraits Inevitable), 2014
- False Colored Eyes (Imploding Portraits Inevitable), 2015 (Burgtheater Wien, Impulstanz Vienna International Dance Festival)
- Candy's Camouflage, 2016

== Film ==
Co-Regie with Mara Mattuschka

- Legal Errorist, 2005 (Permanent exhibition at Centre Georges-Pompidou, Paris)
- Part Time Heroes, 2007
- Running Sushi, 2008
- Burning Palace, 2009
- Perfect Garden, 2014

== Awards ==
- 2004 Award for best performance at the Biennale de la Dance Lyon, with "Fremdkoerper”
- 2007 Goldener Löwe at the Biennale in Venedig for "Best Performance" with Posing Project B – The Art of Seduction (with Liquid Loft)
- 2008 NORMAN, Wand 5, Stuttgarter Filmwinter for "Part Time Heroes", (with Mara Mattuschka / Liquid Loft)
- 2008 Best innovative Experimental-, Animation and short movie at Diagonale – Festival of Austrian Film with "Running Sushi" (with Mara Mattuschka / Liquid Loft)
- 2009 Diaphone Award, Cindeans, Amsterdam, für "Burning Palace", (with Mara Mattuschka / Liquid Loft)
- 2009 Audience Award, Wand 5, Stuttgart for "Running Sushi", (with Mara Mattuschka / Liquid Loft)
- 2009 Award Kurzfilmtage Oberhausen, for "Burning Palace", (with Mara Mattuschka / Liquid Loft)
- 2010 outstanding artist award – Darstellende Kunst, Bundesministerium für Unterricht, Kunst und Kultur for Chris Haring.

== Literature ==
- Andrea Amort, Mimi Wunderer-Gosch (Hrsg.): Österreich tanzt. Geschichte und Gegenwart. Böhlau-Verlag, Wien 2001, ISBN 3-205-99226-1.
- Kim Knowles: Film, Performance, and the Spaces Between: The Collaborative Works of Mara Mattuschka and Chris Haring (forthcoming)
