= Futoshi Miyagi =

Okinawan artist and writer

Futoshi Miyagi (ミヤギ フトシ, Miyagi Futoshi; born 1981) is an Okinawan artist and writer. He works in various mediums, such as photography, objects, video and text, to construct narratives on the subjects of sexual minorities and untold stories in history, often in relation to Okinawa. Much of Miyagi's earlier work is inspired by his own memories and coming to terms with his identity as a gay Okinawan man. Over the course of his career, Miyagi has increasingly expanded the range of his subjects to include imagined characters and historical figures. Miyagi is most known for his American Boyfriend Series, an ongoing project that addresses the topic of queer relationships through narrative form. The series, a culmination of Miyagi's multidisciplinary approach, consists of a blog, numerous video works, and a novel, and mimics the evolution of his oeuvre from semi-autobiographical to historically based fiction. Miyagi takes influences from a wide range of arts and media, including the work of feminist writers and artists Lucy Lippard and Mierle Laderman Ukeles, contemporary artists Félix González-Torres and Ryan McGinley, and classical composers Bach and Beethoven. For his photographs and video work, Miyagi has been recognized as a finalist for the Kimura Ihei Award and the Nissan Art Award.

In addition to his art practice, Miyagi is active in the art community as a writer and serves as the co-director of the artist run gallery space, XYZ collective in Tokyo.

== Early life and education ==
Miyagi was born and raised in Kumejima, Okinawa. After graduating from high school, Miyagi studied at a language school in Osaka designed to help Japanese students enroll in American universities. While in Osaka, Miyagi experimented with photography for the first time using a LOMO camera he bought during a rise in the popularity of blog culture and lomography. With his camera, Miyagi wandered around his neighborhood at night to shoot but felt that his lack of knowledge left him with primarily blurred "unsuable" photographs. Miyagi later went to New York in 2003 and initially considered a degree in journalism. However, he felt that his language ability was not proficient enough so he switched to photojournalism and later photography. Miyagi completed a BA (art) at City College of New York in 2006.

Although Miyagi recognized his interest in other men at a young age, he remained quiet about his sexuality for most of his teens and early twenties. He felt that his hometown of Okinawa and the small community of Kumejima was not accepting of homosexuality. His first in person exposure to gay culture was at an Osaka club where he saw drag queens and other men dancing together. While in Osaka, Miyagi did began seeking connections to gay friends through bulletin boards websites though his interactions with other gay men were generally limited to online conversations. He did not officially come out until he was in the United States.

== Artist career ==
=== New York ===
Miyagi began to pursue a career as an artist after arriving in New York. As a university student there, Miyagi found inspiration in Félix González-Torres and gravitated towards the personal and diaristic nature of González-Torres's writing and work. Miyagi also related to González-Torres as a gay immigrant who left home to come to the US. Similarly, Miyagi started to incorporate deeply personal experiences into his own work and as the beginning of his career coincided with his coming out, Miyagi chose to directly address his identity as a gay man through his photography. His decision was motivated, in part, by a desire to more easily announce his coming out without needing to explain it to everyone he met. It was also a means for Miyagi, whom struggled in bars and parties, to connect with the gay community.

During this time, Miyagi was interested in creating work similar to that of Ryan McGinley, whose intimate and playful images of friends were well known in New York in the mid-2000s, but struggled to find easy access to the type of partners and friends that featured in McGinley's photos. For his breakout series and coming out project Strangers (2005–2006), Miyagi instead relied on online sites such as Gay.com, Friendster, and the "men seeking men" sex section on Craigslist to solicit volunteers who would allow him into their home to take photographs together. In his orchestrated images, Miyagi and his photographed partners are typically juxtaposed within a bedroom or bathroom with their expressions far off in separate places. The photographs, said to elicit feelings of unease and awkwardness, have been lauded for their ability to encapsulate the "double identity crisis" Miyagi was experiencing in both his journey coming out and his status as a foreigner. The series features an array of different men he met online and include some members of the NYC photography scene such as Paul Mpagi Sepuya. For his solo show at Daniel Reich Gallery in 2006, Miyagi displayed some of his multi-medium proclivities with the inclusion of handwritten translations of a Japanese pop song and objects made from relics in his room along with the photographs.

Following Strangers, Miyagi continued to engage with photography but rather than being a declaration of his identity, he experimented with photography as an investigation of personal memory. For the artist statement of Untitled (Self-Portrait, Twelve Rolls of Exposed Film) (2006), in which Miyagi exposed the film negatives of self portraits to light before they were developed, Miyagi uses a quote from Daidō Moriyama to suggest that through destruction (of the image) there is possibility for the memory of something new. These works were early examples of Miyagi's interest in the process of removal or absence and the subsequent potential for creating new meaning, which came to serve as guiding theme throughout the remainder of his career. Between 2006 and 2007, he manipulated photographs in various methods to create photo-objects that resulted in the obscuration or erasure of the initial image. Some of his manipulations include burning a personal photo album, removing himself from prints using bleach, and shredding a photo of his hometown to use the scraps for a collage work.

=== Career in Japan ===
Due to visa complications, Miyagi returned to Japan and relocated to Tokyo in 2007. Over the next few years, Miyagi expanded on his play with theme of absence and creation through numerous mediums such as installation, object, and video based work. In some of his works, the theme is expressed literally through the physical act of unwinding and removal, such as the work Hope We'll See Each Other Soon Again (2009), wherein Miyagi created a fence in a gallery with yarn with a path cut open, and later sew together gloves using the removed strings of yarn. In other works absence is expressed through the use of every day objects, such as empty glasses and used cigarette butts, that evoke the presence of a person or relationship that is not directly shown. Miyagi's use of repetitive actions and common objects was partially influenced by the work of American feminist writers and artists such as Lucy Lippard and Mierle Laderman Ukeles, especially the latter who sought to reframe daily actions and life as an extension of her art practice. In many of his works between 2007 and 2011, Miyagi continued to draw from personal experiences and often referenced actual people and events in his life, such as gifts for his parents that he never sent or translations of songs he used to listen to as a teenager. For Miyagi, in the process of recalling these memories, absences and time gave space to the transformation of those memories, highlighted during the process of writing his autobiography wherein despite his best efforts "the time-line is confused, and new anecdotes pop up all the time".

From the late 2000s onwards, Miyagi also began to combine his personal experiences with the stories of fictional characters, notably a relationship he had with an imagined AWOL soldier in Okinawa. Miyagi presented numerous photographs and object works meant as belongings of the fictional soldier and also provided narrative details of their interactions. This invented relationship with a US soldier was a precursor to his highly regarded and multi-year project American Boyfriend Series.

==== American Boyfriend Series ====
American Boyfriend Series was launched in 2012 when Miyagi started writing a diaristic blog considering the possibility of romance between an Okinawan man and a male American soldier. There Miyagi wrote that one of reasons for his blog and the imagined romance was to understand why Okinawan society was so hostile to homosexual relationships and concealed them. As he continued his research, Miyagi used the blog as a site to record memories and findings about the hidden relationships and untold stories within Okinawa.

Miyagi went on to create five video works for American Boyfriend Series: Ocean View Resort (2013), A Romantic Composition (2015), Flower Names (2015), How Many Nights (2017), and The Dreams That Have Faded (2018). Similar to the progression of the blog, the evolution of the video works increasingly expanded outward from personal experiences to those of numerous mythical, fictional, and historical figures. While the characters and settings of each work differs, most of the stories include undertones of suppressed queer desire and Miyagi's ruminations on possible people and relationships that might have existed but weren't saved or popularized in the records of history. Miyagi's outward move was a result of his finding that many of the issues that arose when researching the possibility of relationships between men in Okinawa were universal, and through a narrative approach, Miyagi could present stories from times and places completely different from himself.

Under the American Boyfriend Series, Miyagi also released the novel Distant (2019) which was compiled from three connected stories he published prior in the literary magazine Bungei: Scenes from America (Bungei, 2017 summer), I See a Darkness (Bungei, 2017 autumn), and Stranger (Bungei, 2018 autumn). Each of the three stories are inspired by Miyagi's own experiences in NYC and Japan with his childhood crush and relationships with men. Miyagi has likened the work to a novel based version of his coming out series Strangers.

===== The Ocean View Resort (2013) =====
Ocean View Resort follows the story of an Okinawan man visiting home. Along the beach, he meets his friend, and unrequited childhood love, "Y" who recounts the events that took place there during and after the war. Y also tells the story of his grandfather who shared a moment of intimacy with an American soldier while listening to Beethoven's String Quartet No. 15 together. The video transitions to a memory of cruel acts committed by Japanese soldiers during the war. The relationship between the narrator and Y is loosely based on Miyagi's own experiences of unexpressed love for a friend. The melding of personal history and larger Okinawan history was an attempt by Miyagi's to find a way relate to the island's way history which he and his generation felt largely disconnected from.

===== A Romantic Composition (2015) =====
A Romantic Composition presents the fictional relationship between an Okinawan pianist and American Vietnam veteran, also an amateur violinist, and the friendship they developed together after a night spent drinking, playing music and watching movies at the bar in the Okinawa Hilton. The story is narrated by the veteran's son who reveals that his father was a closeted gay man and left his family due to the trauma he sustained during the Vietnam war. For A Romantic Composition, Miyagi conducted field interviews and ethnographic research on gay culture in U.S. bases and nightclubs. Miyagi has noted that the music choice of Bach's Chaconne was significant because the piece, which had been once forgotten and later unearthed, was a metaphorical foil to the bodies of soldiers and Okinawans buried during the war remain undiscovered.

===== Flower Names (2015) =====
Flower Names is broken into multiple chapters spanning from European mythology to contemporary Okinawa and are connected by the universal theme of cyclical violence and desire. The work begins with the story of Chloris who was raped by Zephyrus, and subsequently features the love triangle between Zephyrus, Apollo and Hyacinthus, which Miyagi has noted was a story that Mozart attempted to make into an opera even though same-sex relationships were forbidden; the romantic relationship between Marcel Proust and composer Reynaldo Hahn; and ends with an American serviceman stationed in Okinawa who talks about the lack of impact the repeal of Don't Ask Don't Tell had on US bases. Each of the chapters relates back to Chloris, with Reynaldo Hahn being the composer for À Chloris, which is then later lip-synced by the serviceman when performing in drag.

Miyagi has often included various objects and photographs when exhibiting the video work Flower Names including a Hyacinth flower that was being grown within the gallery at MIMOCA in 2015, and a close up of Zephyrus and Chloris from a reproduction of Botticelli's The Birth of Venus shown at the Mori Art Museum.

===== How Many Nights (2017) =====
Unlike Miyagi's other video works How Many Nights takes on a female narrator and covers the stories of 5 different women spread across different regions and time periods. The main characters include Winnifred Eaton, a 20th-century Chinese Canadian novelist posing under a pseudonym as a Japanese American; Yuki, the protagonist of Eaton's book A Japanese Nightingale; Tokyo Rose, a Japanese propaganda radio broadcaster during WWII; a failed female composer; and an unnamed Japanese women interned at the Manzanar concentration camp. Miyagi was interested in presenting a diaristic narrative of various women whose stories are connected through the act of writing and reading, whether it be novel, letter, script or score. Miyagi's decision to adopt a female voice was an extension of his efforts to test to what degree he can empathize with stories outside of himself and how universal the issues addressed in the series can be. Similar to his earlier videos, How Many Nights features suggestions of queer romance as indicated by acts such as one lead character who spent the night with another women.

== Writing and publishing activities ==
Miyagi is an avid writer and contributor for numerous magazines and currently has his own book/media review column for Bijutsutecho.

Miyagi has also been involved with the creation and dissemination of art books, including history working at Printed Matter in NYC and UTRECHT in Tokyo, and the Tokyo Art Book Fair. Between 2011 and 2013, Miyagi published his own magazine OSSU which centered on the subject of male sexuality in Japan.

== Exhibitions ==
=== Selected solo exhibitions ===
- 2006: Brief Procedures. Daniel Reich Gallery, New York
- 2007: Island of Shattered Glass. Daniel Reich Gallery, New York
- 2009: Author. hiromiyoshii, Tokyo
- 2009: The Cocktail Party. Daniel Reich Gallery, New York
- 2010: A Cup of Tea. hiromiyoshii, Tokyo
- 2012: American Boyfriend. Ai Kowada, Tokyo
- 2013: American Boyfriend: The Ocean View Resort. Raum1F, Tokyo
- 2013: New Message. Post, Tokyo
- 2014: American Boyfriend: The Bodies of Water. Kyoto City University of the Arts Gallery @KCUA, Kyoto
- 2017: How Many Nights. Gallery Koyanagi, Tokyo
- 2018: The Dreams That Have Faded. CAI02, Sapporo

=== Selected group exhibitions ===
- 2008: 25 Under 25: Up-and-Coming American Photographers Exhibition. Tisch School of the Arts at NYU, New York
- 2009: Intimate Acts. Perth Institute of Contemporary Art, Perth, Australia
- 2010: BigMinis. musée d'art contemporain de Bordeaux, Bordeaux
- 2015: Our Beloved World. Marugame Genichiro-Inokuma Museum of Contemporary Art, Marugame
- 2015: Nissan Art Award. BankART Studio NYK, Yokohama
- 2015: Time of Others. Museum of Contemporary Art Tokyo, The National Museum of Art Osaka, Singapore Art Museum
- 2015: VOCA: The Vision of Contemporary Art. The Ueno Royal Museum, Tokyo
- 2016: Spider's Thread. Toyota Municipal Museum of Art
- 2016: Taiwan International Video Art Exhibition. Hong-gah Museum, Taipei
- 2016: Aichi Triennale 2016: Rainbow Caravan. various locations, Aichi
- 2016: Time of Others. Queensland Gallery of Modern Art, Australia
- 2016: Roppongi Crossing 2016: My Body, Your Voice. Mori Art Museum, Tokyo
- 2017: Flap-flop, Clap-clop: A Place Where Words are Born. Arts Maebashi, Maebashi
- 2017: Mode of Liaisons. Bangkok Art and Culture Center, Bangkok
- 2017: Almost There. Jorge B. Vargas Museum, Manila
- 2018: Going Away Closer. Centro de Arte Contemporáneo Wilfredo Lam, Havana
- 2019: Where We Now Stand—In order to Map the Future. 21st Century Museum of Contemporary Art, Kanazawa
- 2019: Image Narratives: Literature in Japanese Contemporary Art. The National Art Center, Tokyo
- 2019: Artists Today. Okinawa Prefectural Museum and Art Museum, Naha
- 2020: Assembridge Nagoya 2020. Nagoya
- 2020: SAPPORO ART – Good bye SHOWA Building. CAI 02, Sapporo
- 2021: Tsubaki-kai 8, Shisedo Gallery, Tokyo

== Selected publications ==
- It's Snowing in My Bedroom. New York: Daniel Reich Gallery, 2007.
- New Message. Tokyo: Torch Press, 2013.
- Distant. Tokyo: Kawade Shobo Shinsha, 2019
