= Content Label (record label) =

American independent record label

- Founded: 2004
- Founder: Dday One
- Genre: World music, instrumental hip hop, electronic
- Country of origin: U.S.
- Location: Los Angeles, California
- Official website: www.thecontentlabel.com

The Content Label is a Los Angeles based independent record label and collective. It was formed in 2004 by music producer Dday One.

== Roster ==
- 2Tall/Om Unit
- Blak King
- Block Barley
- Dday One
- Dextah
- Double K (People Under the Stairs)
- Enigmatical
- Gone Beyond
- Inner Science
- King Knut
- Marques Lafelt
- Mumbles
- Olde Soul
- Glen Porter
- Son of a Bricklayer
- Antti Szurawitizki

== Cover artists ==
- ETMCA
- Mikko Kempas
- Oliver Cartwright
- Shane "Dwarf Baby" Ingersoll
- Udeze Ukwuoma

== Discography ==
- CNT-1001 Dday One - Loop Extensions (2005)
- CNT-1002 Dday One / Dextah - Sense of Balance/Untitled #541 (2006)
- CNT-1003 Various - Signal Path (2007)
- CNT-1004 Dday One - Heavy Migration (2008)
- CNT-1005 2Tall - The Softer Diagram (2008)
- CNT-1006 Olde Soul | Double K - Taking Me Places/Face to Face (2008)
- CNT-1007 King Knut - Grazing On Empty Remixes (2009)
- CNT-1008 Dday One - Journal - (2009)
- CNT-1009 Dday One | Glen Porter - Wavelengths (2010)
- CNT-1010 Son Of A Bricklayer - The Day the Sky Fell In (2011)
- CNT-1011 Various - Content (L)abel Sampler 1 (2011)
- CNT-1012 Various - Content (L)abel Sampler 2 (2011)
- CNT-1014 Dday One - Loop Extensions | Deluxe (2011)
- CNT-1015 Dday One - Mood Algorithms (2011)
- CNT-1017 Gone Beyond | Mumbles -A Duet for Space and Time (2012)

== See also ==
- List of record labels
