= Aldo Giannotti =

Italian-Austrian artist (born 1977)

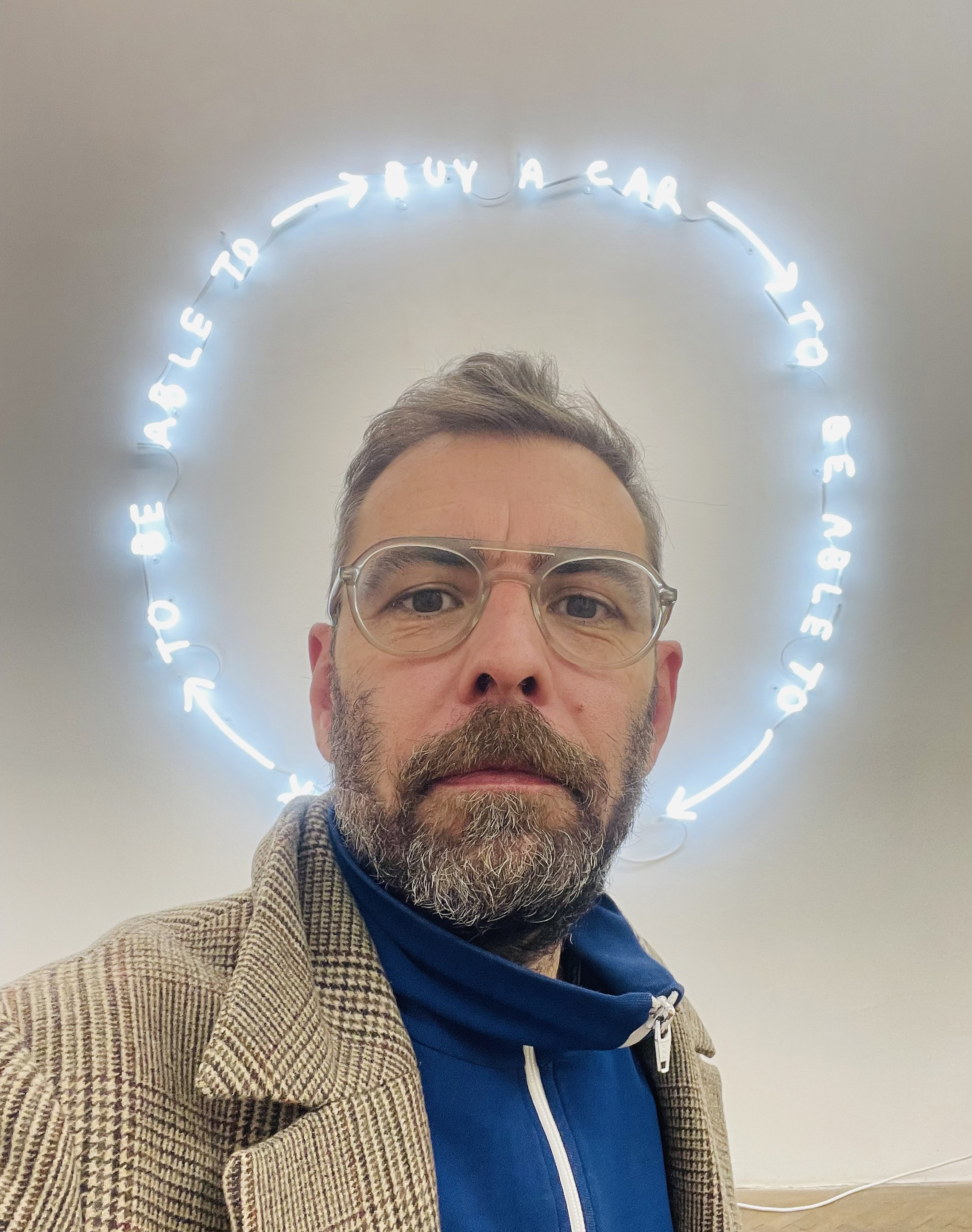
- Aldo Giannotti at the Exhibition ON AND ON, Projektraum ViktorBucher on 9 November 2021
- Born: Genoa, Italy
- Education: Accademia di Belle Arti Carrara (Italy), Academy of Fine Arts Wimbledon (England), Akademie der Bildenden Kunste Munich
- Known for: Drawing Performance art and Installation
- Website: http://www.aldogiannotti.com

Aldo Giannotti (born in 1977) is an Italian-Austrian artist. A native of Genoa, has grown up in Massa, Tuscany. He lives and work in Vienna since 2000.

== Biography ==
Aldo Giannotti studied at the Accademia di Belle Arti di Carrara (Italy) with Omar Galliani. He furthered his studies at the Academy of Fine Arts Wimbledon (England) in video and at the Akademie der Bildenden Kunste Munich in photography.

His work includes solo and group exhibitions in the field of Installation art, video, photography. In addition, he is curator and project manager of various exhibition projects.

His installation The Museum as a Gym was one of two selected projects in a national/international competition and was on show at Kunsthaus Graz from 12 June to 21 August 2016. This not only tested the fitness possibilities of the exhibition venue, but also encouraged the audience to participate physically.

From 6 July to 11 September 2016, he showed the installation Spatial Dispositions at the Albertina in Vienna.

Giannotti has realised wall drawings in three buildings in Vienna in 2016-2017 in the context of the project Buildings on Buildings and four wall paintings in his native town of Massa in Italy

The Museo d'Arte Moderna of Bologna (MAMbo) has organised in May–September 2021 the exhibition "Safe and Sound", Giannotti's first anthological exhibition in an Italian institution, curated by Lorenzo Balbi with the curatorial assistance of Sabrina Samorì. The exhibition included not only drawings but also and installations, video works, readaptations of spatial structures a series of original performances based on unexpected behaviour of the museum guards.

== Awards ==
In the context of the 36th Austrian Graphic Art Competition in 2019 he has been awarded with the Austrian Graphic Art Award by the State Capital of Innsbruck.

In May 2016, he was the winner of the Pomilio Blumm Prize, the first 'Talent show' promoted by Sky Arte TV and the 'Pomilio Blumm' communication company in Milan

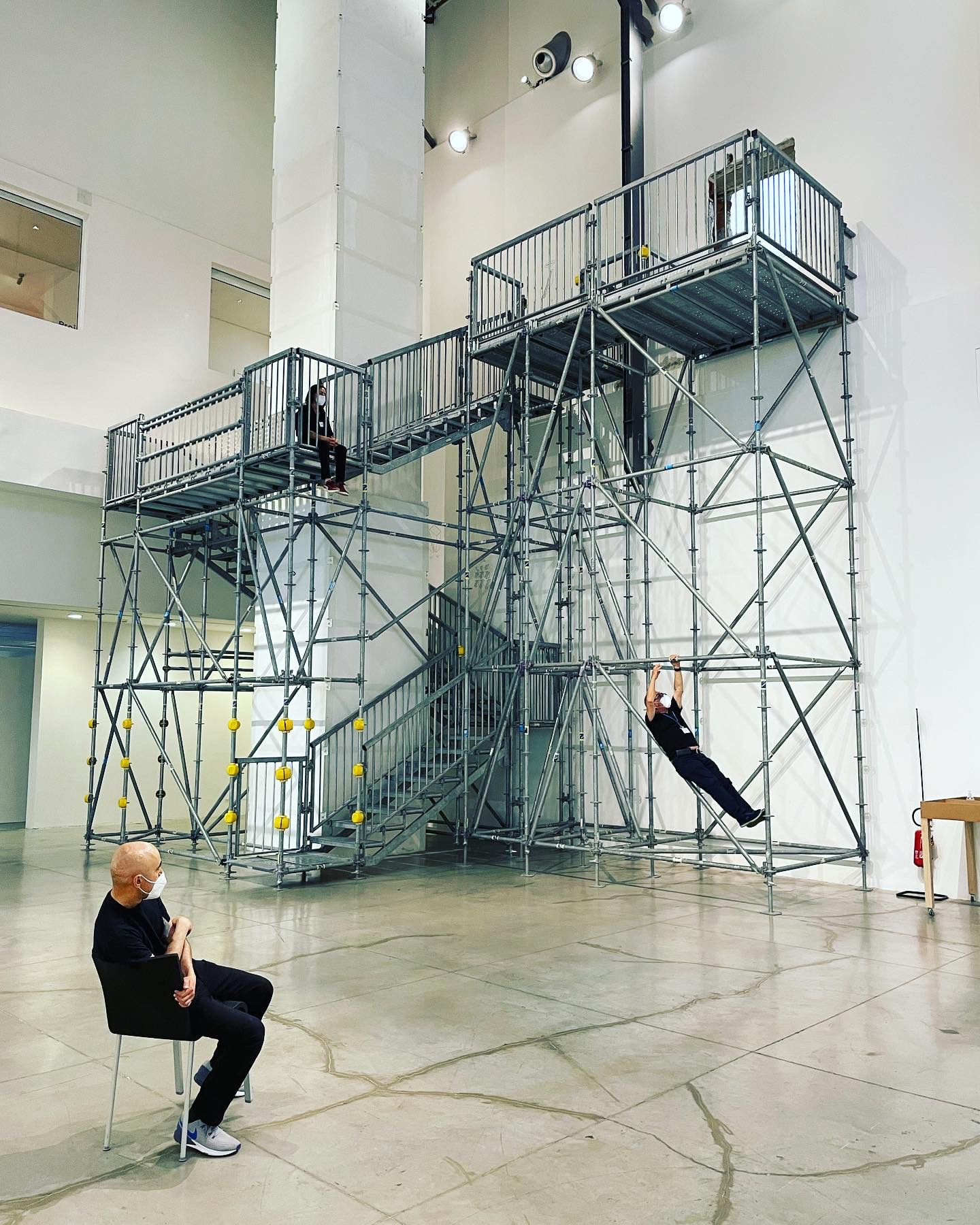
The Museum Score performance during Aldo Giannotti's exhibition "Safe And Sound", Mambo, Bologna (Italy) 2021

== Selected exhibitions ==
- Safe and Sound, MAMbo, Museo d'Arte Moderna di Bologna, Bologna, 2021, curated by Lorenzo Balbi
- Viral, 2020
- Hall of the Muses, Albertina, Vienna, 2019, curated by Elsy Lahner
- Italian embassy - Palais Metternich Vienna: exhibition Domenica with Pablo Chiereghin and Massimo Vitali, 2017. Inaugurated by Giorgio Marrapodi, Italian ambassador, Stella Rollig, general director of Österreichische Galerie Belvedere, Ivica Vastić, Austrian football legend, and Marcello Farabegoli, curator and producer of the exhibition.
- Spatial Dispositions, ar/ge Kunst Gallery, Museum, Bolzano, 2015, curated by Emanuele Guidi

== Bibliography ==
- Aldo Giannotti, Spatial Dispositions I, II, III, Verlag fur Moderne Kunst, 2019 ISBN 978-3903004115.
- Aldo Giannotti, Viral, Verlag fur Moderne Kunst, 2020 ISBN 978-3903796171.
- Aldo Giannotti, Welcome & Goodbye, Mousse Publishing, 2022 ISBN 978-8867494514.
- Aldo Giannotti, Tomaz Kramberger, Eva, Martischnig (editors), A book with 50 potential ideas for the exhibition is published, Forum Stadtpark Graz, 2009, ISBN 978-3-901109-26-3 Digital version
