= Prabhavathi Meppayil =

Indian abstract artist (born 1965)

- Born: Bangalore
- Education: Ken School of Art
- Notable work: n/eighty two (2016)
- Movement: Minimalism

Prabhavathi Meppayil (born 1965) is an Indian abstract artist known for her modernist and minimalist paintings, and installation art.

== Biography ==
Prabhavati Meppayil was born in Bangalore. She belongs to a family of goldsmiths, her father and brother being craftsmen of handmade jewellery.

After obtaining a BA from Bangalore University in 1986, she studied for a diploma in Fine Art at the Ken School of Art.

Meppayil established her studio on Avenue Road in Bangalore, an area with a concentration of goldsmiths.

== Technique ==
Meppayil's works involve the use of traditional materials and artisanal techniques. She works with gesso, and copper, gold and iron wires. Her studio involves master metalworkers who stretch the metals that she then embeds into the gesso panels. She lays the gesso in multiple layers over wooden panels and polishes them. The interplay between the metal and the gesso has not entirely predictable results, the surface colours themselves age over time. In some works, she has used the traditional thinnam, jewellers' steel tools, to create microscopic indents, both horizontal and vertical, across the gesso.

== Critical reception ==
Benjamin H. D. Buchloh's analysis of Meppayil's work regards its formal nature. It suggests that the use of white was so that it could become a space for writing, or get assimilated as architecture. Meppayil agrees that the interstitial spaces are important to her. He has also described it as a collision of ordering principles and disordering strategies, as it expands on the Modernist theme of anti-narration. He hoped that there would be a nuanced appreciation for the work, recognising the historical specificity of her artistic approach.

In Shanay Jhaveri's view, the use of a reduced colour palette and visual considerations of the grid is a dialogue between Western Modernism of the 1950s and 1960s and contemporary South Asian art, expressing the clashing aesthetics of Indian neoliberalism versus the progressive ideals of Modernism.

Other reviewers have likened Meppayil's abstractions to those of Conceptual Minimalism and the Italian Pittura Segnica, evoking among others Gastone Novelli.

== Exhibitions ==
Meppayil's art was displayed at the 55th Venice Biennale in 2013, the Pace Gallery in London in 2014, and at the Art Basel Unlimited in 2016. It has been presented at the 2016–2017 Kochi-Muziris Biennale. In 2016, her work was exhibited at the Dhaka Art Summit.

One of her works "fourteen/sixteen" was sold for $20,000 at the Frieze Art Fair in London in 2016.
