= Hana Usui =

Japanese artist (born 1974)

- Born: April 17, 1974 (age 52); Tokyo
- Known for: Drawing

Hana Usui (ウスイ ハナ, Usui Hana; born April 17, 1974 in Tokyo) is a Japanese artist.

Hana Usui was born in Tokyo in 1974 and studied art history at Waseda University and Japanese calligraphy. In 2000, she moved to Vienna to start a career as a visual artists and then primarily worked in Berlin. Since 2011, Hana Usui has lived and worked in Vienna and Bolzano-Bozen in Italy. Her drawings are made of black or white oil paint, which she carves into paper with a screwdriver and often embeds into ink washes.

"The works of the Japanese artist Hana Usui, who was born in Tokyo in 1974, are, however restrained, of great complexity. This is true of the relationship of oil drawing and ink painting (or photography), of the combination of drawing and painting techniques, of linear conciseness and spaciousness. The resulting richness of levels of expression also characterises the critical works that have dominated in recent years. Those on the history of her own country, on Fukushima or Hiroshima, give the subject a new dimension by avoiding anything striking or the purely documentary and are never to be seen as a political manifesto. Thanks to this distancing and mere suggestion and the symbolic in the artistic media, they gain, one might say, in quiet intensity and at the same time remain open to questions. In this way, freed of their historical context, warning and appeal demonstrate their enduring validity."

== Selected solo exhibitions ==
- 2019 Vienna Art Week: Bei Uns (Around Here), WOP – Works on Paper, Vienna / AT
- 2018 An das Leben (To Life), Artcurial Austria, Vienna / AT
- 2018 Black End, Galerie Dittmar, Berlin / DE
- 2016 High & Slow, with Thilo Westermann, Kunsthaus Kaufbeuren / DE
- 2015 Schwarzer Regen (Black Rain), Bildraum 01, Vienna / AT
- 2015 Hana Usui – Works on Paper, Galerie Dittmar, Berlin / DE
- 2015 Hana Usui – Works on Paper, Galerie Daniela and Cora Hölzl – EY5, Düsseldorf / DE
- 2013 Hana Usui – Drawings, Galerie Dittmar, Berlin / DE
- 2012 Vienna Art Week: Hana Usui. Drawings on paper 2006–2012, Kunsthalle Wien Karlsplatz / AT (Presentation of catalogue and works)
- 2009 Prace na papierze / Works on Paper, Museum of Japanese Art and Technology Manggha, Krakau / PL
- 2009 Eine Linie ist eine Linie (A line is a line), with Friederike Maltz, Essenheimer Kunstverein / DE
- 2009 Works on Paper, Galerie Waidspeicher at Haus zum Güldenen Krönbacken, municipal gallery in Erfurt / DE
- 2008 Von der japanischen Kalligrafie zur freien Kunst (From Japanese calligraphy to free art), Schwartzsche Villa, Kommunale Galerie in Berlin / DE
- 2008 Open Art: Kiku, Galerie Lichtpunkt, Munich / DE
- 2008 Kataru Sen – Disegno a cacciavite (Kataru Sen – Drawing with a screwdriver), 41 artecontemporanea, Turin / IT
- 2007 Asien-Pazifik Wochen: Negativ (Negative), Galerie oko, Berlin / DE
- 2006 Works on paper and objects, with Michel Sauer, Kunstkontor Rampoldt, Berlin / DE
- 2005 Einsamkeit in Berlin (Loneliness in Berlin), Galerie oko, Berlin / DE
- 2002 Kuso Galleria, Tokio / JP
- 1998 Kuso Galleria, Tokio / JP

== Selected group exhibitions ==
- 2019 Japan Unlimited, frei_raum Q21 exhibition space Museumsquartier Wien / AT
- 2019 Works from the Collection, City Museum of Rimini / IT
- 2018 Show Me Your Wound, Dom Museum Wien / AT (bis 2019)
- 2017 Works from the Collection of the Kupferstichkabinett, Kunsthalle Bremen / DE
- 2017 Parallel Vienna (art fair): Parallel and concordant / AT
- 2016 Drawing Biennal: Profili del mondo: L'umano paesaggio da Giudo Reni a Kiki Smith, FAR – Fabbrica Arte Rimini, City Museum of Rimini / IT
- 2016 Parallel Vienna (art fair): Border Crossing / AT
- 2015 Vienna Art Week: Perpetuum Mobile, Garage – KunstHausWien / AT
- 2014 Salotto.Vienna Viennese Art Salon presented by MAK – Austrian Museum of Applied Arts / Contemporary Art, Ex Pescheria, ex Pescheria – Salone degli Incanti, Triest / IT (Presentation and performance with Casaluce Geiger)
- 2014 Vienna Art Week: No more Fukushimas, Marcello Farabegoli Projects at Verein08, Vienna / AT
- 2013 Contemporary Art and Calligraphy: At the Nexus of Painting and Writing, Seoul Arts Center / KR
- 2011 The Esprit of Gestures. Hans Hartung, Informel and Its Impact, Gut Altenkamp, Papenburg / DE
- 2010 The Esprit of Gestures. Hans Hartung, Informel and Its Impact, Kupferstichkabinett – Staatliche Museen zu Berlin / DE
- 2010 KAMI. Silence- Action. Japanese Contemporary Art on Paper, Kupferstich-Kabinett – Staatliche Kunstsammlungen Dresden / DE
- 2010 Art to GO II, Kommunale Galerie Berlin / DE
- 2009 Sensai / Weiss – die Reinheit der Form in der japanischen Kunst (Sensai / White – the purity of form in Japanese art), Museum Residenzgalerie Salzburg / AT
- 2008 Parallel event of Manifesta 7: the pix of signs, City Gallery of Bolzano-Bozen / IT
- 2005 Japan Now, Manggha Center of Japanese Art and Technology – The National Museum in Krakow / JP
- 1994–98 Tokio Metropolitan Art Museum / AT

== Selected collections ==
- Akademie der bildenden Künste Wien – Kupferstichkabinett / AT
- Albertina, Vienna / AT
- Angermuseum Erfurt / DE
- Auswärtiges Amt der Bundesrepublik Deutschland
- Berlinische Galerie – State Museum of Modern Art, Photography & Architecture, Berlin / DE
- Dom Museum Wien – Otto Mauer Contemporary / AT
- Kommunale Galerie Berlin / DE
- Kunsthalle Bremen / DE
- Museo della Cittá di Rimini / IT
- Museum of Japanese Art and Technology Manggha, Krakow / PL
- Museum Kunstpalast, Düsseldorf / DE
- Museum der Moderne Salzburg / AT
- Neuer Berliner Kunstverein / DE
- Neue Nationalgalerie, Berlin / DE
- Staatliche Kunstsammlungen Dresden - Kupferstich-Kabinett / DE
- Staatliche Museen zu Berlin - Kupferstichkabinett / DE
- Zentral- und Landesbibliothek Berlin / DE

== Selected bibliography ==
- Maak, Niklas (February 26, 2006). "Linientreu: Die Japanische Malerin Hana Usui bei Oko Berlin". Frankfurter Allgemeinen Zeitung (in German).
- Hammer, Brigitte (2006). "Ein schwarzer Strich setzt eine ganze Welt. Gedanken zu einigen Arbeiten von Hana Usui" [A black line sets a whole world. Thoughts on some of Hana Usui's work]. Hana Usui (in German). Berlin: Galerie oko and Kunstkontor Rampoldt.
- Farabegoli, Marcello (2008). "Von der Japanischen Kalligraphie zur freien Kunst – Arbeiten auf Papier von Hana Usui". Von der japanischen Kalligrafie zur freien Kunst: Arbeiten auf Papier von Hana Usui (in German). Berlin: Bezirksamt Steglitz-Zehlendorf.
- Maak, Niklas (August 26, 2010). "Linien, die in die Zukunft führen". Frankfurter Allgemeinen Zeitung (in German).
- Maaz, Bernhard (2012). "Affektstrich und Explosionsblatt / Affective Stroke and Explosive Sheet". Hana Usui – Drawings on paper 2006–2012 (PDF) (in English and German). Vienna: Marcello Farabegoli. ISBN 978-3-2000-2808-1.
- Schalhorn, Andreas (2012). "Der Linie auf der Spur. Zu den Zeichnungen von Hana Usui / Tracing the Line. On the Drawings by Hana Usui". Hana Usui – Drawings on paper 2006–2012 (PDF) (in English and German). Vienna: Marcello Farabegoli. ISBN 978-3-2000-2808-1.
- Maak, Niklas (9 August 2015). "Kunstwerk der Woche: "Hana Usuis Fukushima-Bild"". Frankfurter Allgemeine Sonntagszeitung (in German).
- Dittmar, Peter (2015). "Einleitung". In Dittmar, Peter (ed.). Hana Usui (in German). Berlin: Galerie Dittmar. ISBN 978-3-9815-4722-1.
- Astroh, Michael (2015). "Zwischen Zeichnung und Malerei. Zur Bildgestaltung im Werk von Hana Usui". In Dittmar, Peter (ed.). Hana Usui (in German). Berlin: Galerie Dittmar. ISBN 978-3-9815-4722-1.
- Markhof, Marietta Mautner (2015). "Hana Usui – Schwarzer Regen / Hana Usui – Black Rain". In Dittmar, Peter (ed.). Hana Usui (in German). Berlin: Galerie Dittmar. ISBN 978-3-9815-4722-1. And in: Hana Usui: Politische und sozialkritische Arbeiten 2014 – 2019 / Political and sociocritical works 2014 – 2019 (in German and English). Translated by Dittrich, Monika. Vienna: Marcello Farabegoli Projects. 2019. ISBN 978-3-2000-6693-9.
- Maaz, Bernhard (2016). "Exerzitien in Schwarz und Weiß: Zur Kunst von Hana Usui und Thilo Westermann". In Wilms, Jan T. (ed.). High & Slow: Hana Usui – Thilo Westermann (in German). Kaufbeuren: Kunsthaus Kaufbeuren.
- Buschhoff, Anne (2016). "Hana Usui. Vom Weg des Schreibens zu Wegen der Zeichnung". In Wilms, Jan T. (ed.). High & Slow: Hana Usui – Thilo Westermann (in German). Kaufbeuren: Kunsthaus Kaufbeuren.
- Knofler, Monika (January 2018). "Abstraktion als Code / Abstraction as Code". Magazin für Kunst und Architektur. And in: Hana Usui: Politische und sozialkritische Arbeiten 2014 – 2019 / Political and sociocritical works 2014 – 2019 (in German and English). Translated by Dittrich, Monika. Vienna: Marcello Farabegoli Projects. 2019. ISBN 978-3-2000-6693-9.
- Ermen, Reinhard (April–May 2018). "Zeichen zur Zeit: Hana Usui". KUNSTFORUM International (in German). Vol. 253.
- Schedlmayer, Nina (2019). "Menschen aus Papier. Hana Usuis Werkkomplex zur Todessstrafe in Japan / Paper Humans. Hana Usui's Cycle about the Death Penalty in Japan". Hana Usui: Politische und sozialkritische Arbeiten 2014 – 2019 / Political and sociocritical works 2014 – 2019 (in German and English). Translated by Dittrich, Monika. Vienna: Marcello Farabegoli Projects. ISBN 978-3-2000-6693-9.
- Nonami, Liesa (2019). "Hana Usui – An das Leben / Hana Usui – To Life". Hana Usui: Politische und sozialkritische Arbeiten 2014 – 2019 / Political and sociocritical works 2014 – 2019 (in German and English). Translated by Dittrich, Monika. Vienna: Marcello Farabegoli Projects. ISBN 978-3-2000-6693-9.
- Speidel, Klaus (2019). "Spuren zur Diskriminierung im urbanen Raum. Eine praktische Semiotik der Ausgrenzung / Traces of Discrimination the Urban Space. A Practical Semiotics of Exclusions". Hana Usui: Politische und sozialkritische Arbeiten 2014 – 2019 / Political and sociocritical works 2014 – 2019 (in German and English). Translated by Dittrich, Monika. Vienna: Marcello Farabegoli Projects. ISBN 978-3-2000-6693-9.
- Liesmann, Konrad Paul (2019). "Menschengemachte Menschenleere. Zum Fukushima-Zyklus von Hana Usui / A Human Desert Made by Humas. About the Fukushima Cycle by Hana Usui". Hana Usui: Politische und sozialkritische Arbeiten 2014 – 2019 / Political and sociocritical works 2014 – 2019 (in German and English). Translated by Dittrich, Monika. Vienna: Marcello Farabegoli Projects. ISBN 978-3-2000-6693-9.
