= Anna Kohlweis =

Austrian musician (born 1984)

- Also known as: Squalloscope, Paper Bird
- Born: June 30, 1984 (age 40); Klagenfurt, Austria
- Genres: Alternative
- Occupation(s): multimedia artist, illustrator, music producer, singer-songwriter
- Years active: 2006–present
- Labels: Seayou Records
- Website: 'annakohlweis.com'

Squalloscope (born Anna Kohlweis, Klagenfurt, Austria June 30, 1984) is an Austrian singer-songwriter, multimedia artist, illustrator and music producer. Between 2006 and 2011, she used the stage name Paper Bird for her music.

== Early life ==
Kohlweis attended BRG Klagenfurt-Viktring Gymnasium, with an emphasis on musical education. From 2004 to 2009 she was enrolled at the University of Vienna, studying theater, film, and media studies; between 2008 and 2014 she completed her M.A. in Fine Arts at the Academy of Fine Arts, Vienna.

== Discography ==
=== Studio albums ===
- Peninsula (2006)
- Cryptozoology (2008)
- Thaumatrope (2009)
- Soft Invasions (2012)
- Exoskeletons for Children (2017)
- Weightbearer (2022)

=== EPs ===
- Desert (2013)
- Dispenser Box (2015)
- Unpleasant Design (2016)
- Annette EP (2020)
- Old Songs EP (2020)
