= Edgar Honetschläger =

Austrian artist, filmmaker, environmental activist

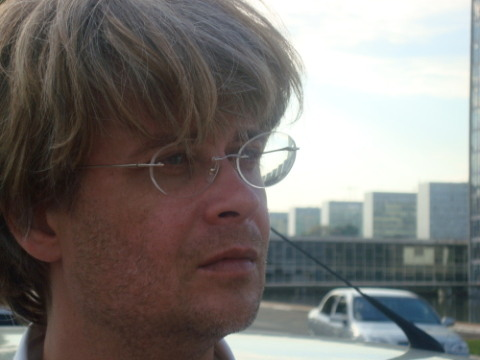
Edgar Honetschläger.

Edgar Honetschläger is an Austrian artist, filmmaker, environmental activist and is the co-creator of Chickens Suit, a clothing range for chickens.

== Personal life ==
Edgar Honetschläger, born in Austria, spent four years in the US, twelve years in Japan, three years in Italy and one in Brazil. 1997 he participated in Documenta X, 1998 he presented his first feature film MILK at the Berlinale. His photos, drawings, paintings, videos and installations were shown at Mudam, National Palace Museum Taiwan, Kunsthallen Brandts Odense Denmark, Triennale Milano, Kunsthalle Vienna, Hammer Museum, Art Basel or Sagatcho Exhibit Space Tokyo among others. His works are to be found in public and private collections, for example at Minato Mirai Yokohama Japan, the Albertina Vienna, IBM, the Museum of Modern Art Salzburg, Bank Austria Vienna, in the Artothek - Collection of the government of Austria, the T-Mobile Collection and Red Bull Salzburg Austria. The artist and filmmaker currently lives in Italy and Vienna.

== Works ==
=== NPO ===
- GOBUGSGO (2018)

=== Films ===
- FLUKUTHUK (2018), 13min.
- LOS FELIZ (2016), 105 min.
- 320 FILOSOFIANA (2015), 18min.
- OMSCH (2013), 83min.
- KAZUE (2012), 2min.
- LONGING (2012), 3min.
- AUN (2011), 100min.
- SUGAR AND ICE (2008), 6min.
- BEIJING HOLIDAY (2007), 13min.
- THE AUDIENCE (2006)
- ERNI (2005), 7min.
- IL MARE E LA TORTA (2003), 60min.
- GEORGE IN HOLLYWOOD (2002), 3min.
- ENDURING FREEDOM (2002), 4min.
- LOS FELIZ (2001)
- ISOLA FARNES (2001)
- L + R (2000), 79min.
- COLORS = the history of chocolate, masaccio, in times of emergency (2000), 33min.
- MILK (1997), 100min.
- 97-(13+1) (1996), 10min.
- HCN MIAU (1995)
- GADGETS (1994), 12min.
- SEQUENCES (1991), 15min.

=== Group and Solo Shows ===
- 1990 Palais Wittgenstein, Vienna
- 1991 MJS Books and Graphics, New York
- 1992 Kunst Raum Stuttgart; Austrian Cultural Institute New York; Asacloth Gallery, Tokyo
- 1993 Gallery Hosomi, Tokyo; SAI Gallery, Osaka
- 1994 Sagacho Exhibit Space Tokyo
- 1995 Art Fair Yokohama; Philips Galerie, Vienna
- 1997 documenta X; Griffin Contemporary Exhibitions, Los Angeles; Art Basel
- 1999 Artforum Meran; Kunstraum Viktor Bucher, Vienna
- 2000 Kunsthalle Wien, Kunsthalle Krems, FIAC Paris
- 2001 Landesgalerie am Oberösterreichischen Landesmuseum, Linz; Steirischen Herbst, Graz; Triennale Milano
- 2002 Kunsthallen Brandts, Odense; Art Cologne
- 2004 Galerie Charim, Vienna; Vienna Art Fair; Art Zürich
- 2005 World Expo Aichi, Japan; Hangar 7, Salzburg
- 2006 Aarhus Kunstbygning – Center for Contemporary Art
- 2007 Taiwan National Palace Museum, Taipei; Ursula Blickle Stiftung
- 2008 Wien Museum; Fotohof Salzburg; Nationalbibliothek, Vienna
- 2009 Lentos Linz; Kunsthalle Krems
- 2010 MUDAM Luxembourg; Casino Luxembourg
- 2011 Charim Galerie, Vienna; Oberösterreichische Landesgalerie; Rupertinum Salzburg
- 2012 Bambin Art Gallery, Tokyo
- 2013 Kunstforum Montafon; Museum Kunst der Westkünste, Germany; Belvedere 21, Vienna; TBA 21, Wien; Steinbrener/Dempf, Vienna
- 2014 Vienna Art Week; Traklhaus Salzburg; Vienna Parkfair
- 2016 Belvedere 21, Wien; Museo d'Arte Contemporanea di Roma
- 2018 Kunsthalle Wien; Charim Galerie, Vienna
- 2019 Forum Stadtpark Graz; Oberösterreichische Landesgalerie; Museum der Moderne Salzburg

=== Books and Catalogues ===
- 2017 EIN KAPPA GEHT NACH TOKYO, Schlebrügge.Editor, text: Edgar Honetschläger
- 2015 SUGAR and ICE, a book about Brasilia, Schlebrügge. Editor
- 2009 EDOPOLIS, Krems/Luxembourg, Dieter Buchhart+Enrico Lunghi
- 2008 TOKYO PLAIN, Fotohof Salzburg, text: Edgar Honetschläger
- 2001 REGIE/DIRECTING, Linz/Odense, Martin Hochleitner, Georg Seeßlen, Thorsten Sadowsky
- 2000 I HAVE TIME, Jan Tabor
- 1997 97-(13+1), DOCUMENTA X, Edgar Honetschläger
- 1994 SCHUHWERK, Masami Shiraishi, Kazuko Koike, Fumio Nanjo
- 1992 TOOLS, Galerie Asacloth Tokyo + Galerie im Stifter Haus Linz. Junji Ito, Peter Assmann
- 1990 WITTGENSTEIN, with Elisabeth Plank, introduction Oswald Oberhuber, Herbert Lachmayr

== Chickens Suit ==
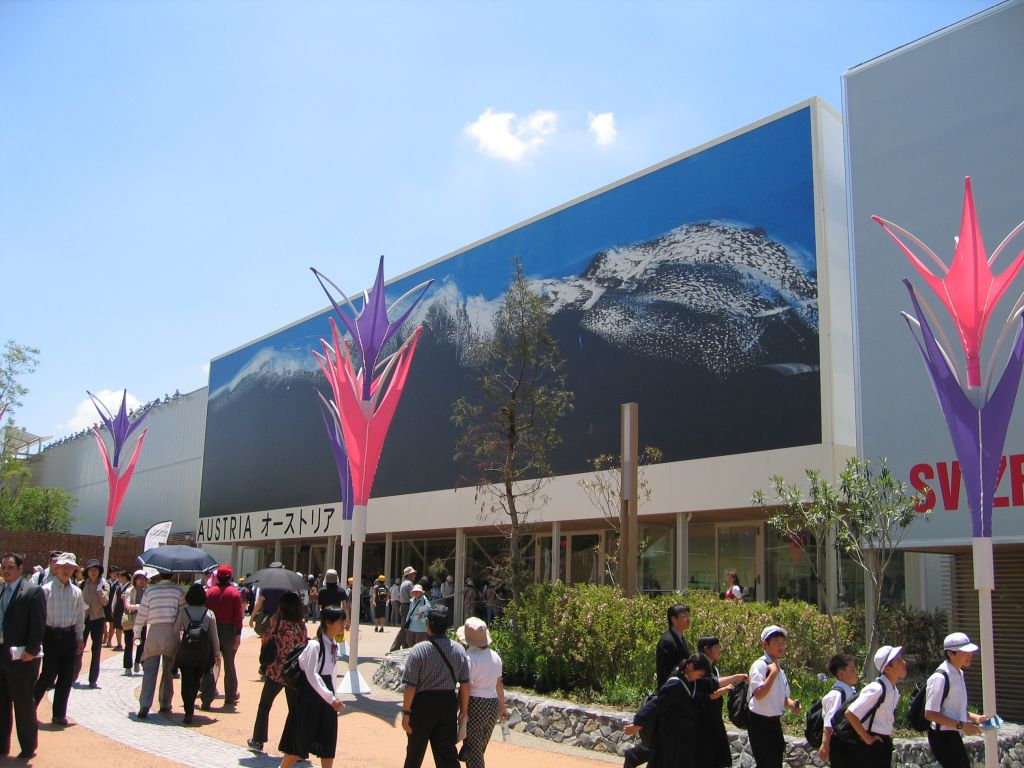
The Austrian Pavilion at the Expo 2005 where Chickens Suit made its debut.

Described by Honetschläger as "something that you don't really need but everyone wants to have anyway", Chickens Suit was released in 2005 with the help of Wilhlem Mahringer. The suits debuted at the Expo 2005 and have toured Paris, Tokyo and Vienna. The suits also come in a variety of styles.
