= Liquid Loft =

Liquid Loft is an internationally active dance company based in Vienna, Austria. It was jointly founded in 2005 by the choreographer Chris Haring, the dancer Stephanie Cumming, the musician Andreas Berger and the dramaturge Thomas J. Jelinek.

== Performances ==
Liquid Loft create stage performances and installations at the intersection of contemporary dance and visual arts, with the sound environment and musical composition playing an integral part of the creative development. In 2007 Liquid Loft was awarded the Golden Lion for “Best Performance” for the piece Posing Project B – The Art of Seduction at the Biennale di Venezia. Science Fiction and the reception of cyborg theory count as the major sources of inspiration for their work. In their performances Liquid Loft reflect, among other things, on the change in our perception through visual media and the everyday use of technology.

== Choreographies ==
- Fremdkörper, 2003
- Diese Körper, diese Spielverderber, 2004
- Legal Errorist, 2004
- My Private Bodyshop, 2005
- Kind of Heroes, 2005
- Running Sushi, 2006
- Posing Project A – The Art of Wow, 2007
- Posing Project B – The Art of Seduction, 2007
- Posing Project C – The Art of Garfunkel, 2008
- Wintersonne (World EXPO Zaragoza), 2008
- The China Project & Lovely Liquid Lounge, 2009 (with Jin Xing Dance Theatre)
- Sacre – The Rite Thing, 2010 (with Les Ballets de Monte-Carlo)
- Talking Head, 2010
- WELLNESS (The Perfect Garden), 2011
- Mush:Room (The Perfect Garden), 2012
- Deep Dish (The Perfect Garden), 2012
- Shiny, shiny… (Imploding Portraits Inevitable), 2014
- False Colored Eyes (Imploding Portraits Inevitable), 2015
- Candy’s Camouflage (Imploding Portraits Inevitable), 2016
- Foreign Tongues (Foreign Tongues), 2017
- Church of Ignorance (Foreign Tongues), 2018
- Babylon (Slang), 2018
- Models of Reality, 2019
- Stand-Alones (polyphony), 2019
- Blue Moon, You Saw ..., 2020
- Stranger Than Paradise, 2021
- Modern Chimeras, 2022

== Collaborations ==
Liquid Loft’s oeuvre also includes choreographies for Dialogue Dance Kostroma, RU (Groza, 2012), Phace Ensemble for contemporary music, Vienna & Arturo Fuentes (Grace Note, 2012), Staatstheater Kassel (Lego Love, 2013), Ballet Moskau (Frozen Laugh 2014), Balletto di Roma (Giselle, 2016), TANZ LINZ (Schwanensee, 2022). Collaborations on various pieces, for example with visual artists such as Erwin Wurm (Kind of Heroes), Aldo Giannotti (Posing Project, Wintersonne, etc.) and Günter Brus (Grace Note). In 2022, Liquid Loft and Odeon Theater jointly initiated the format Living Positions. It brings back to the stage successful productions from previous years.

== Installations ==
Together with visual artist Michel Blazy location-specific installations were created for the series The Perfect Garden, among others at Hof Dietrichsruh, Salzburg and at the Palmenhaus at Vienna’s Burggarten. The installation Posing Project C – The Art of Garfunkel was shown at Künstlerhaus Vienna.

== Film ==
There are four short films and one feature length movie, based on Liquid Loft pieces, created in cooperation with filmmaker Mara Mattuschka: Legal Errorist (2004), Part Time Heroes (2007), Running Sushi (2008), Burning Palace (2009) and Perfect Garden (2010).

== Awards ==
- 2004 Award for best performance at the Biennale de la Dance Lyon, with “Fremdkoerper”
- 2010 outstanding artist award – Performing Arts, Austrian Federal Ministry for Education, Arts and Culture, for Chris Haring.

== Literature ==
- Andrea Amort, Mimi Wunderer-Gosch (eds.): Österreich tanzt. Geschichte und Gegenwart. Böhlau-Verlag, Wien 2001, ISBN 3-205-99226-1.
- Kim Knowles: Film, Performance, and the Spaces Between: The Collaborative Works of Mara Mattuschka and Chris Haring. In: Cinema Journal, vol. 57, No. 2, Winter 2018, p. 89–112. (PDF online)
- Elena Basteri et al.: REHEARSING COLLECTIVITY – Choreography Beyond Dance. Argobooks, Berlin 2012, ISBN 978-3-942700-22-1.
- Angelika Kreitner: Der Begriff der Gemeinschaft im Postdramatischen Theater. Diplomarbeit, Universität Wien, Wien 2010.
- Christina Dettelbacher: Produktionsbedingungen der Freien Zeitgenössischen Tanzszene im Wien der Gegenwart. Magisterarbeit, Ludwig-Maximilians-Universität, München 2013.
- Thomas Edlinger et al.: Shiny Shiny. Verlag für Moderne Kunst, Wien 2020, ISBN 978-3-903796-12-6.
