= Yoshinori Niwa =

Japanese artist (born 1982)

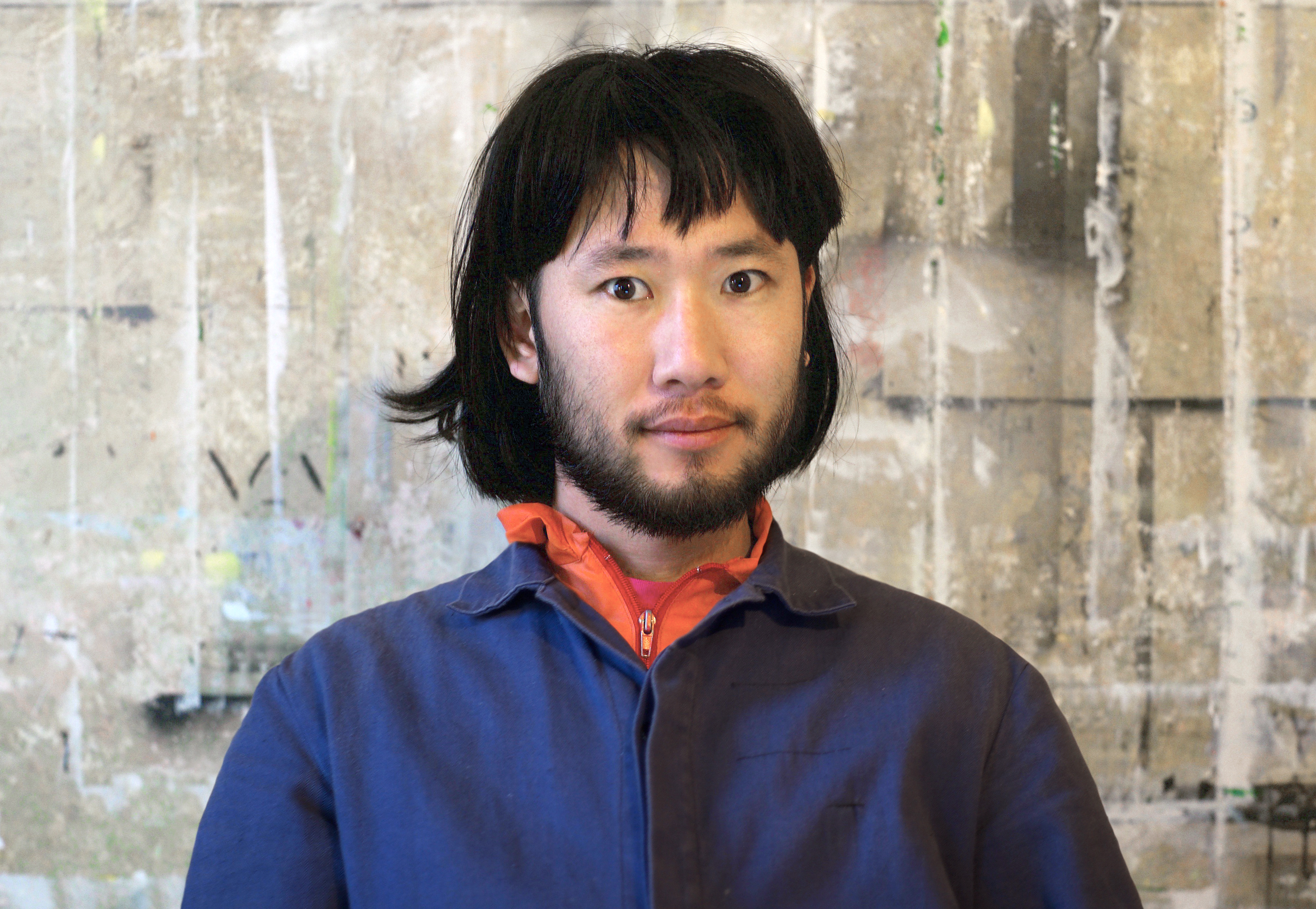
- Niwa in 2018
- Born: 丹羽良徳; 1982 (age 43–44); Aichi, Japan
- Education: Tama Art University, Department of Moving Images and Performing Arts, Tokyo, 2005
- Website: yoshinoriniwa.com

Yoshinori Niwa (丹羽良徳, born in 1982, Aichi Prefecture, Japan) is a Japanese artist currently based in Vienna, Austria. His practice primarily consists of social interventions performed in public spaces, as well as mediums in video, performance, and installation. Niwa's art often carries humorous and provocative undertones, employing direct and slogan-like titles to explore and critique contemporary societal and capitalist structures. His work investigates collective behavior, social norms, and political themes, sometimes drawing on the absurd to challenge established systems.

== Early life and education ==
He was born in Aichi Prefecture, Japan and graduated from Tama Art University department of moving image and performing arts in 2005. His career started as a performance artist in early 2000, and he has been making documentary style videos internationally such as in Europe and Asia. In early 2010, he started a series project which re-exams the history of communism in Eastern Europe in Bucharest, Romania, and he did a project in which he was looking for people who still had something Lenin-related in their apartments for the group show Double Vision: Contemporary Art From Japan at the Moscow Museum of Modern Art in 2012. The series works had exhibited at Mori Art Museum, Tokyo and Alkatraz Gallery, Ljubljana and Edel Assanti, London.

At his project, Selling the Right to Name a Pile of Garbage, he was actually running an auction to sell the rights to temporarily rename a part of huge garbage Landfill in Novaliches, the Philippines in collaboration with local landfill operation company WACUMAN Inc. and a lawyer in 2015 to ensure that the landfill's naming rights they made sure the landfill's naming rights were transferred via a deed of sale signed by the landfill owner and other responsible parties, then filed with a public notary. At the end of the project, only documents and photos remained. The winning bid for the landfill's naming rights was Php11,111 (US$250). The result of this auction had shown at the Vargas Museum, Metro Manila.^{[6]}

== Career ==
Early Work

Yankee Chicken Farm (2005), Going to San Francisco to Dispose of my Garbage (2006) where he took house rubbish and boarded a plane, crossing back and forth between Japan and the US, SPRINGTIDE (2006), Transforming puddle A to puddle B (2009), Communicating with Thieves (2010) where he projected the words, On aika varastaa! which means It's time to steal! slogans onto the walls of several bank buildings on Saturday, March 27, at 7.30 pm–11 pm.

Recent Work and Exhibitions

Steirischerherbst’18 (2018), Withdrawing Adolf Hitler from a Private Space (2018), The Communities We Must Have Imagined (2019), Burning Blood (2019), Purchasing Blood with the company's Budget (2019), Unavoidable Work in Order to Keep Us Alive (2019), IME FOR OUTRAGE! ART IN TIMES OF SOCIAL ANGER, Museum Kunstpalast (2020), Carrying My Own Belongings Inside the Body (2021), 10th Bucharest Biennale (2022), Sending an Invoice to that Museum in Moscow (2022), Narrating our Possessions (2022) in which he randomly read legible words over the telephone in a public space in London as he crawled through the street toward the gallery, Living in Someone's Possessions (2023) he temporarily borrowed various things from ordinary people and attempted to imitate their daily lives and the 8th Yokohama Triennale (2024), Purchasing a Rice Ball at Convenience Stores for 24 Hours (2024).

== Art and style ==
=== Social interventions ===
Niwa's practice is a critique on societal structures and capitalism. Through the construction of absurd scenarios, he deploys a nonsensical vernacular to examine systems of exchange that drive contemporary society, as well as disjunctures in collective conceptions of history, ideology and value—an artistic strategy whose roots can be traced to the post-war Japanese avant-garde.

=== Use of humor and absurdity ===
Niwa uses humor and absurdity to make his art both critical and accessible. An example of which would be actions like Transforming Puddle A to Puddle B (2004) involve seemingly nonsensical tasks to highlight the arbitrary nature of societal norms and expectations. This playful approach often draws viewers into a deeper critique of authority and tradition

These themes, presented through various media such as video, installation, and performance, emphasizes Niwa's commitment to experimenting with actions and propositions exposing the systems of exchange that drive contemporary society.

=== Public spaces ===
Niwa frequently places himself in unusual situations in order to undermine and expose the emptiness of systems designed to create an illusion of "publicness". He prefers working in open spaces to dismantle the separation between art and everyday life. Many of his projects are set in open, communal areas, aiming to disrupt archetypal power dynamics and create a direct interaction and reaction with the public. Works like Withdrawing Adolf Hitler from a Private Space (2018) engaged individuals in a reflective act of confronting historical artifacts in private and public contexts.

== Notable works ==
Tossing Socialists in the Air in Romania, 2010 Exchanging between Turkish Lira and Euros in Istanbul until there is nothing left, 2011 Looking for Vladimir Lenin at Moscow Apartments, 2012 Selling the Right to Name a Pile of Garbage, 2014 Paying a Courtesy Call on the Incumbent Mayor by All His Predecessors in History, 2016

== Exhibitions ==
Selected Solo Exhibitions

Work in Progress: Ending War on the Other Side of the Earth. Satoko Oe Contemporary, Tokyo, 28 May 2024 - 22 Jun. 2024.

Why Does Humankind Engage in Economic Activity? Satoko Oe Contemporary, Tokyo, 15 Apr. 2023 - 20 May 2023.

Rehabilitating Our Human Spirit Under Capitalism. Tenshin Okakura Gallery, Japan Foundation/Shrine Empire, New Delhi, 2023.

Dictatorship of Possessions. Edel Assanti, London, 2022.

Yoshinori Niwa: On Rehabilitation of Domination and Domain. Match Gallery/The Museum and Galleries of Ljubljana, Slovenia, 2021.

Withdrawing Adolf Hitler from a Private Space. GOLD+BETON, Köln, 2021.

Rehabilitation of Ancestors. Zimmermann Krachtowill, Graz, 2020.

The Community We Must Have Imagined. Satoko Oe Contemporary, Tokyo, [First period] 24 July - 9 Aug. 2019, [Second period] 25 Aug. - 6 Sept. 2019.

We Unanimously Agree on a Plan That Nobody Has Asked For. PARCO Gallery X, Tokyo, 2019.

That Language Sounds Like A Language. Edel Assanti, London, 2017.

We're Heading to a Place Where Nobody Wants to Go By the Will of All. 1335MABINI, Manila, 2017.

MAM Screen #5: Yoshinori Niwa Selected Video Works. Mori Art Museum, Tokyo, 4 Feb. - 11 June 2017.

Selected Group Exhibitions

Asian Art Biennial—How to Hold Your Breath. National Taiwan Museum of Fine Arts, Taichung, 2024.

Horror Patriae. steirischer herbst ’24, Graz, Austria, 19 Sept. - 13 Oct. 2024.

8th Yokohama Triennale Wild Grass: Our Lives. Yokohama Museum of Art, Yokohama, 15 Mar. - 9 June 2024.

Curated By. GABRIELE SENN GALERIE, Vienna, 2023.

Japanese Constitution Exhibition. Aoyama｜Meguro, Tokyo, 22 Apr. - 11 June 2023.

Water/land/forest/mountain/sky. Odisha State Museum, Delhi, 2022.

Bucharest Biennale 10. Bucharest, Romania, 26 May - 3 July 2022.

spring show: Yoshinori Niwa and Naoya Hirata. Satoko Oe Contemporary, Tokyo, 17 May - 11 June 2022.

Uncurated. Kunstraum Feller, Vienna, 12 Mar. - 29 Apr. 2022.

INEXISTENT BOOKS V. Aula46, Barcelona, 2022.

COLOMBOSCOPE 2021. Colombo, Sri Lanka, 2022.

Five Exercises of Resistance. Eretz Israel Museum, Tel Aviv, 2022.

Disposing of Hitler: Out of the Cellar, Into the Museum. The House of Austrian History, Vienna, 2021.

Rule? 21_21 DESIGN SIGHT, Tokyo, 2021.

summer show. Satoko Oe Contemporary, Tokyo, 24 July - 7 Aug. 2021, 24 Aug. - 4 Sept. 2021.

Taking My Thoughts for a Walk. Organised by Dortmunder Kunstverein+Urbane Künste Ruhr, Dortmund, 2021.

#JAPANREVISTED202X. Austrian Cultural Forum Tokyo, 2020, online.

BIG IDEAS– Political Ideologies and Their Aftermath. philomena+, Vienna, 2020.

TIME FOR OUTRAGE! ART IN TIMES OF SOCIAL ANGER. Museum Kunstpalast, Düsseldorf, 2020.

Everything You've Ever Wanted is On the Other Side of the Planet. Angewandte Innovation Laboratory, Wien, 26 Nov. - 25 Dec. 2020.

Genealogie der Dinge. Kunstverein Kärnten, Klagenfurt, 2020.

RISO IS IT. OIL by Bijustsutecho, Tokyo, 2020.

Evacuation. Satoko Oe Contemporary, Tokyo, 2020.

FIT’RI:NA فترينة. philomena+, Vienna, 2020.

Games.Fights.Encounters. OnCurating Project Space, Zurich, 2020.

das weisse ab haus verkaufskunstschauw. das weisse haus, Vienna, 2019.

Shigeru HASEGAWA and Yoshinori NIWA. Satoko Oe Contemporary, Tokyo, 23 Oct. - 16 Nov. 2019.

Setouchi Triennale 2016. Naoshima Island, Japan, 2016.

Roppongi Crossing 2013: OUT OF DOUBT. Mori Art Museum, Tokyo, 2013.

Aichi Triennale 2013. Aichi Arts Center, Nagoya, 2013.

Double Vision: Contemporary Art From Japan. The Moscow Museum of Modern Art, Moscow, 2012.

== Publications ==
Historically Historic Historical History of Communism, Art-Phil, 2015 Reenacting Publicness. The Interventionist Projects, My Book Service, 2014
