= Shizuka Yokomizo =

Japanese photographer

Shizuka Yokomizo (横溝 静 Yokomizo Shizuka, born 1966) is a Japanese photographer and installation artist.

Originally from Tokyo, Japan, she currently lives and works in London.

== Biography ==
Yokomizo studied philosophy at Chuo University in Tokyo from 1985 to 1989. The same year, she moved to the United Kingdom to study fine arts at Chelsea College of Art and Design. After earning her degree, she continued to study the arts at Goldsmiths University of London from 1993 to 1995. Much of her photography utilizes chromogenic print. Her work has been displayed throughout the United States, Europe, South Korea, and Japan.

Her work in recent years has been included in At The Window (2013, The Photographer’s View, The J. Paul Getty Museum, Los Angeles); The Other Portrait (2013, Museum of Modern and Contemporary Art of Trento and Rovereto, Rovereto); and Talent Show (2012, MoMA PS1, New York, University of South Florida Contemporary Art Museum, Florida). She took part in Exposed (2010), which toured the Tate Modern in London, the San Francisco Museum of Modern Art (SFMoMA) and the Walker Art Center in Minneapolis. She also participated in Roppongi Crossing 2010 at the Mori Art Museum in Tokyo.

== Artistic practice ==
The conditions under which Yokomizo captures the image are essential to her work—she states, “[m]any people will call me a photographer, but I don’t think of myself as one...“I chose the medium of photography because it allowed me to visualize my perspective and I wanted to confirm my existence and verify the state of my being in those places.”

Exploring “the gap between self and other; the space that exists between ‘me’ and ‘you,’" Yokomizo's work is often a "contrast to the merciless ‘stare’ of documentary photography," seeking to "reproduce a strong sense of reciprocity, and an awareness of one’s own presence in relation to another.” Yokomizo initiated her series Stranger in an attempt to further investigate these relationships, leaving anonymous letters in the mailboxes of first-floor apartments around England. An excerpt from the letter reads,

“I would like to take a photograph of you standing in your front room from the street in the evening. A camera will be set outside the window on the street. If you do not mind being photographed, please stand in the room and look into the camera through the window for 10 minutes… I will NOT knock on your door to meet you. We will remain strangers to each other.”

Her work often addresses ideas of “distance and intimacy, anonymity and exposure, collaboration and control, surveillance and exhibitionism,” focusing on the "moment of exchange with the subject."

== Notable works ==
- Sleeping series (1995–1997), C-type print
- Stranger series (1998–2000), C-type print
- untitled/Hitorigoto series (2002), C-type print
- When You Wake (2002), double-screen projection
- Forever (and again) (2003), double-screen projection
- PRAYER (2007), single-screen projection
- Flow (2007), single wall projection and 15-inch monitor
- all series (2008–2010), C-type print and lipstick
- Phantom series (2008–2015), C-type print and multi-video installation
- Impose/Retreat series(2014), diptych, gelatin silver fiber print
- Register series (2014), C-type print
- untitled/Kurogo series (2015), gelatin silver print from digital file
- Some Myth series (2015), C-type print, deer skin, oak flame

Her work is held in the following public collections:

- Ferens Art Gallery, Kingston upon Hull, UK
- Japan Foundation Collections, Tokyo, Japan
- Museum of Contemporary Photography, Columbia College, Chicago, USA
- Nottingham Castle Collections, UK
- Norton Museum of Art, Miami, USA
- The J. Paul Getty Museum, Los Angeles, USA
- Tokyo Metropolitan Museum of Photography, Tokyo, Japan
- San Francisco Museum of Modern Art, San Francisco, USA
- Vangi Museo/The Sculpture Garden Museum, Shizuoka, Japan
- 21st Century Museum of Contemporary Art, Kanazawa, Kanazawa, Japan
- National Museum of Modern and Contemporary Art, Korea, Seoul, South Korea

== Exhibitions ==
=== Solo exhibitions ===
- Sleeping, Wako Works of Art, Tokyo (JP), 1997.
- Light – Say Something Funny, Taka Ishii Gallery, Tokyo (JP), 1997.
- Sleeping, Duncan Cargill, London (UK), 1998.
- Dear Stranger, The Approach, London (UK), 2000.
- Dear Stranger, Cohan Leslie and Browne, New York, NY (US), 2001.
- Shizuka Yokomizo, Museo D’arte Contemporanea di Roma, Rome (IT), 2002.
- Shizuka Yokomizo, The Approach, London (UK), 2002.
- Shizuka Yokomizo, Cohan and Leslie, New York, NY (US), 2003.
- Untitled (Hitorigoto), Wako Works of Art, Tokyo (JP), 2003.
- Forever (and again), Wako Works of Art, Tokyo (JP), 2003.
- Forever (and again), Galería Leyendecker, Santa Cruz de Tenerife (ES), 2003.
- Distance, Site Gallery, Sheffield; Chapter, Cardiff; Spacex Gallery, Exeter (UK), 2004.
- Distance, Galería Leyendecker, Santa Cruz de Tenerife (ES), 2005.
- Prayer, Wako Works of Art, Tokyo (JP), 2007.
- I Can Feel It (But I Can't See It), Wako Works of Art, Tokyo (JP), 2008.
- Shizuka Yokomizo, Galería Leyendecker, Tenerife (ES), 2009.
- Shizuka Yokomizo, Daiwa Foundation Japan House, London (UK), 2014.
- Kurogo, Wako Works of Art, Tokyo (JP). 2015.

=== Selected group exhibitions ===
- Strangers: The First ICP Triennial of Photography and Video (2003): a critical assessment of new or previously unseen developments in photography and video. The "Strangers" theme refers to the recent revival of urban street photography, as well as to the issue of fear and trust in public spaces after September 11, 2001.
- Past in Reverse: Contemporary Art of East Asia (2004): artworks by 22 artists and artist groups from China, Japan, South Korea, Taiwan, and Hong Kong, the exhibition aims to present the latest trends in the contemporary art scene in Asia.
- Out of the Ordinary/ Extraordinary: Japanese Contemporary Photography (2004): a worldwide tour exhibition introducing the works of eleven Japanese photographers. These artists "with their differing values and viewpoints, are confronting the complexity and indecipherability of an increasingly complicated world and attempting to come up with new forms and expression."
- Roppongi Crossing: Can There Be Art? (2010) (六本木クロッシング2010展：芸術は可能か？): a series of exhibitions produced by the Mori Art Museum to introduce Japanese creative talents working in a wide range of genres. The first in the series was held in 2004 – and is to this day used as a reference point for contemporary Japanese art scene.
- Exposed: Voyeurism, Surveillance, and the Camera (2010): the exhibition focuses on surveillance, including works by both amateur and press photographers, and images produced using automatic technology such as CCTV. The issues raised are particularly relevant in the current climate, with topical debates raging around the rights and desires of individuals, terrorism and the increasing availability and use of surveillance.
- Japanese Photography from Postwar to Now (2016): examines the significant contributions to the art of photography that come from postwar Japan. Organized thematically, the show explores topics such as Japan’s relationship with America, changes in the city and countryside, and the emergence of women as significant contributors to contemporary Japanese photography.

== Publications ==
A collection of her photos, titled Distance, was published in 2004. "Distance" was Yokomizo's first solo exhibition in a public-funded space in the UK. It traveled from Exeter to Cardiff and Sheffield.

Distance was published in conjunction with the Spacex touring exhibition, 'Shizuka Yokomizo: Distance', curated by Tom Trevor and organized in collaboration with The Approach (London).
