= Massimo Vitali =

Italian photographer based in Lucca (born 1944)

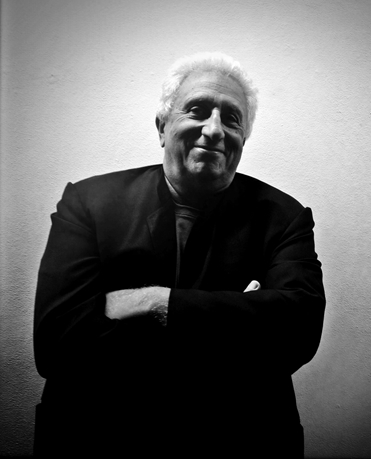
Vitali in 2013

Massimo Vitali (born 1944) is an Italian photographer based in Lucca.

== Life and work ==
Vitali was born in Como, Italy. He studied photography at the London College of Printing. He initially worked as a photojournalist for the Report Agency in the 1970s, and later as a movie camera operator.

In 1995 he took on fine art photography, often standing on a podium four or five meters high, and using large-format film cameras to capture high-resolution details over a broad expanse in locations such as beaches, clubs and public spaces.

His work has been shown in the Centro de Arte Reina Sofia in Madrid, the Guggenheim Museum in New York City, the Museum of Contemporary Art in Denver, the Fond National Art Contemporaine in Paris, the Centre Pompidou in Paris, the Musée National d'Art Moderne in Paris, the Fondation Cartier in Paris and the Museo Luigi Pecci in Prato.

== Publications ==
- So Now Then (Ffotogallery, 2006)
- Les plages du Var (Hotel des Arts, 2000)
- dormir/sleep (coromandel, 2000)
- Beach and Disco (Steidl, 2000)
- Landscapes with Figures (Steidl, 2004), ISBN 3-88243-912-2
- Natural Habitats (Steidl, 2011)

== Exhibitions ==
- Massimo Vitali, “Ti ho visto”, Mazzoleni Torino, Italy, 12 April 2022 - 30 June 2022
