= Sound:frame =

Austrian music organisation

Soundframe logo

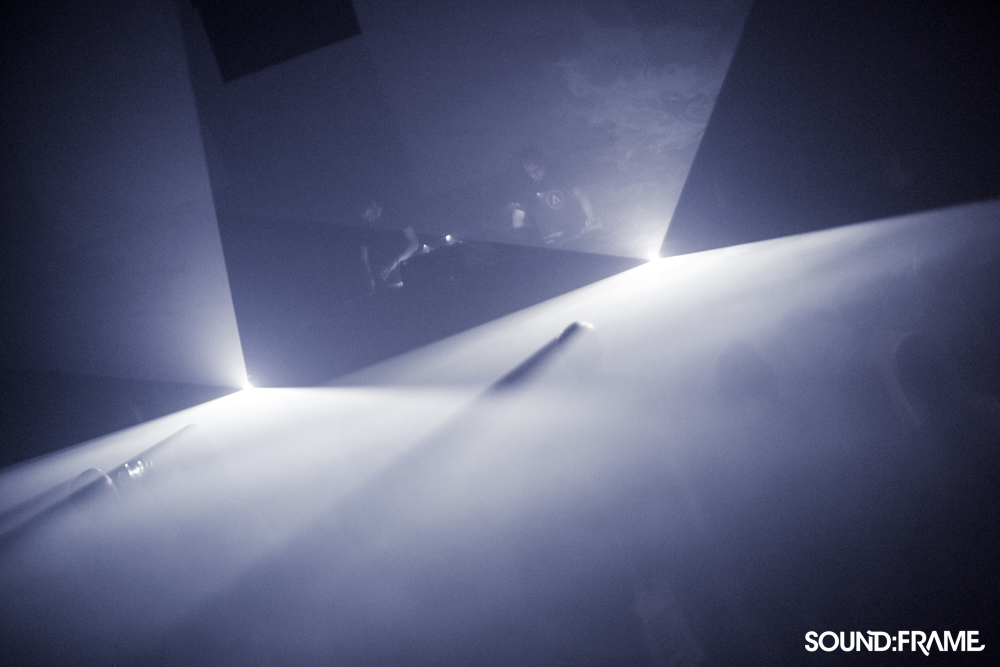
Soundframe 2014

sound:frame is an organisation that holds an annual festival in Vienna, Austria, and an artist and event agency in the fields of audiovisual art, music, intermedia and vjing.

== sound:frame festival ==
Initiated in 2007, the sound:frame festival has been staged annually in Vienna, Austria. The festival activities focus on the link between auditive and visual media in the context of art and culture (interdisciplinarity). The name sound:frame stands for the combination and the equal importance of music (sound = the smallest component of music) and moving image (frame = single film frame).

The sound:frame festival features artworks and performances from the fields of intermedia, generative art, visualization (music visualization), music, media art, architecture, and design.

The festival consists of formats such as exhibitions, audiovisual live performances and concerts, and takes place in nightclubs and public space, galleries and art museums. Theoretical features such as workshops, panel discussions and the production of an annual exhibition catalogue are also part of the festival programming.

Each year the festival counts between 8,000 and 13,000 visitors.

== sound:frame AV ==
The Agency for Contemporary Curating in Audiovisual Art & Culture – sound:frame AV is an Austrian agency which focuses on current international audiovisual art and culture and interdisciplinarity. Its activities range from curating to organizing exhibitions, events and research projects.

== Initiator and artistic director ==
Eva Fischer has been a freelance curator and the initiator and artistic director of the sound:frame festival since 2006. In the same year she started working as a VJ (= VJing). From 2002 to 2007, she worked as an art agent for the Neue Galerie Graz and the Kunsthalle Wien MuseumsQuartier in Vienna from 2002 to 2007. Since 2011, she has been teaching «Audiovisual Media» at the University of Music and Performing Arts, Vienna and, since 2014, she has been teaching «Experimental Media» at the St. Pölten University of Applied Sciences. Eva Fischer lives and works in Vienna, and has a Master's Degree in Art History. She studied at the Universities of Graz, Utrecht, and Vienna.

== Exhibitions ==
2007/8 «sound:frame» sound:frame festival exhibition, Künstlerhaus k/haus, Vienna
2009 «sound:frame:remix», ACFNY, New York City
2009 «Evolution Remixed!» sound:frame festival exhibition, Künstlerhaus k/haus, Vienna
«dimensions» sound:frame festival exhibition, Kunsthalle Project Space, quartier21/MG, Galerie Kasulke, Vienna
2011 «perFORMance» sound:frame festival exhibition, Ottakringer Brauerei, Vienna
2012 «substructions» sound:frame festival exhibition, MAK, Vienna
2012 «Against the Specialist – Contemporary References to Arnold Schoenberg in Image and Sound», ACFNY, New York City
2013 «collective» sound:frame festival exhibition, MAK, Vienna
2013 «sound:frame collective», MediaArtLab / Manege, Moscow
2014 «a matter of...» sound:frame festival exhibition, MAK, Vienna
2015 «LIVE» sound:frame festival live exhibition, MAK, Vienna

== Events and live performances ==
2010 Mapping Festival, Geneva
2010 EXPO, Shanghai
2011 Austria Davaj! exhibition opening, Moscow
2011 Metropolis Late Night, MSO, Melbourne
2012 ROMA JAZZ FESTIVAL, Rome
2012 Donauinselfest EUTOPIA DJ/VJ stage, Vienna
2013 Vienna Art Night, Moscow
2013 Donauinselfest EUTOPIA DJ/VJ stage, Vienna
2014 Donauinselfest EUTOPIA DJ/VJ stage, Vienna
2014 Salotto Vienna Opening, Triest
2014 philival, Vienna
2015 Kulturhauptstadt Europas, Plzeň
2015 Modepalast, Vienna

== Academic work and publications ==
2014 Audiovisuelle Kunst. Entwicklung eines Begriffes – VJing, audiovisuelle Live Performance und Installation im Kontext kunsthistorischer und zeitgenössischer Entwicklungen, Eva Fischer, Akademikerverlag, Saarbrücken
2014 SOUND:FRAME – A MATTER OF ... – Festival for Audiovisual Expressions, sound:frame, Vienna 2008 – 2013 sound:frame catalogues, ed. Eva Fischer, Czernin Verlag (2008 and 2009) and self-published, Vienna, Austria
2013 sound:frame. Vermittlung zwischen den Stühlen, Eva Fischer, eJournal «p-art-icipate» #3: GO PUBLIC! 2013, University of Salzburg
2011 «VJs» oder «VisualistInnen»? Der Versuch einer Kategorisierung, Eva Fischer, in: Im Kontinuum der Bilder, ed. D. Förster, L. Handel and A. Olbrisch, Cologne
2015 sound:frame – LIVE – Festival for Audiovisual Expressions, sound:frame, Vienna
