= Coded Cultures =

Conferences and festivals in Austria

- Status: Active
- Genre: Arts festival
- Locations: Vienna, Austria
- Country: Austria
- Years active: 22
- Inaugurated: 16 May 2004
- Founder: 5uper.net
- Most recent: 29 May 2016
- Area: New media art
- Organiser: Research Institute for Arts and Technology

Coded Cultures is a conference and festival series developed by the Austrian artist collective 5uper.net and since 2016 is included in the Research Institute for Arts and Technology. The first Coded Cultures focused on the theme 'Decoding Digital Culture' and took place over two weeks in May 2004 at the Museumsquartier in Vienna. The 2009 version of the conference and festival was a bi-national event that took part in Austria and Japan as part of the official "Japan - Austria Friendship Year 2009". Further implementations of the festival have discussed topics such as Open Source Hardware, Right to repair, New media art and digital art in cooperation with the apertus AXIOM project and the University of Applied Arts Vienna, the Transmediale Festival and the ISEA (International Symposium on Electronic Art).

Coded Cultures has debated topics publicly, and many international artists, researchers and academics such as Marina Gržinić, Masaki Fujihata, Christa Sommerer, Hans Bernhard and many others have discussed the history, past and future of Coded Cultures.

== Festivals, conferences and implementations ==
No.	Year	Motto	venue place
1	2004	Decoding Digital Culture	MuseumsQuartier in Vienna, Austria
2	2008	Playfulness	DAAL Digital Arts and Architecture Lab in Vienna, Austria
3	2009	Exploring Creative Emergences (Austria)	MuseumsQuartier in Vienna, Austria
4	2009	Exploring Creative Emergences (Japan)	Yokohama City Center in Yokohama, Japan
5	2010	Exchange Emergences	With Japan Media Arts Festival and ISEA International at Dortmunder Kunstverein in Dortmund, Germany
4	2011	City as Interface	Decentralized in Vienna, Austria
5	2012	Subcuratorship beyond Media Arts	With Transmediale Festival in Berlin, Germany
5	2016	Coded Cultures Openism	Museum of Applied Arts, Vienna in Vienna, Austria

== Publications ==
- Coded Cultures: New Creative Practices out of Diversity (2011) ISBN 9783709104583 ISBN 9783990433904
- Coded Cultures: City as Interface, 5uper.net (2011) ISBN 3200023589 ISBN 978-3200023581
- Coded Cultures: Exploring Creative Emergences (2009) ISBN 3200015322 ISBN 978-3200015326
