= Belvedere 21 =

Modernist style building in Vienna, Austria

Coordinates: 48°11′09″N 16°23′00″E

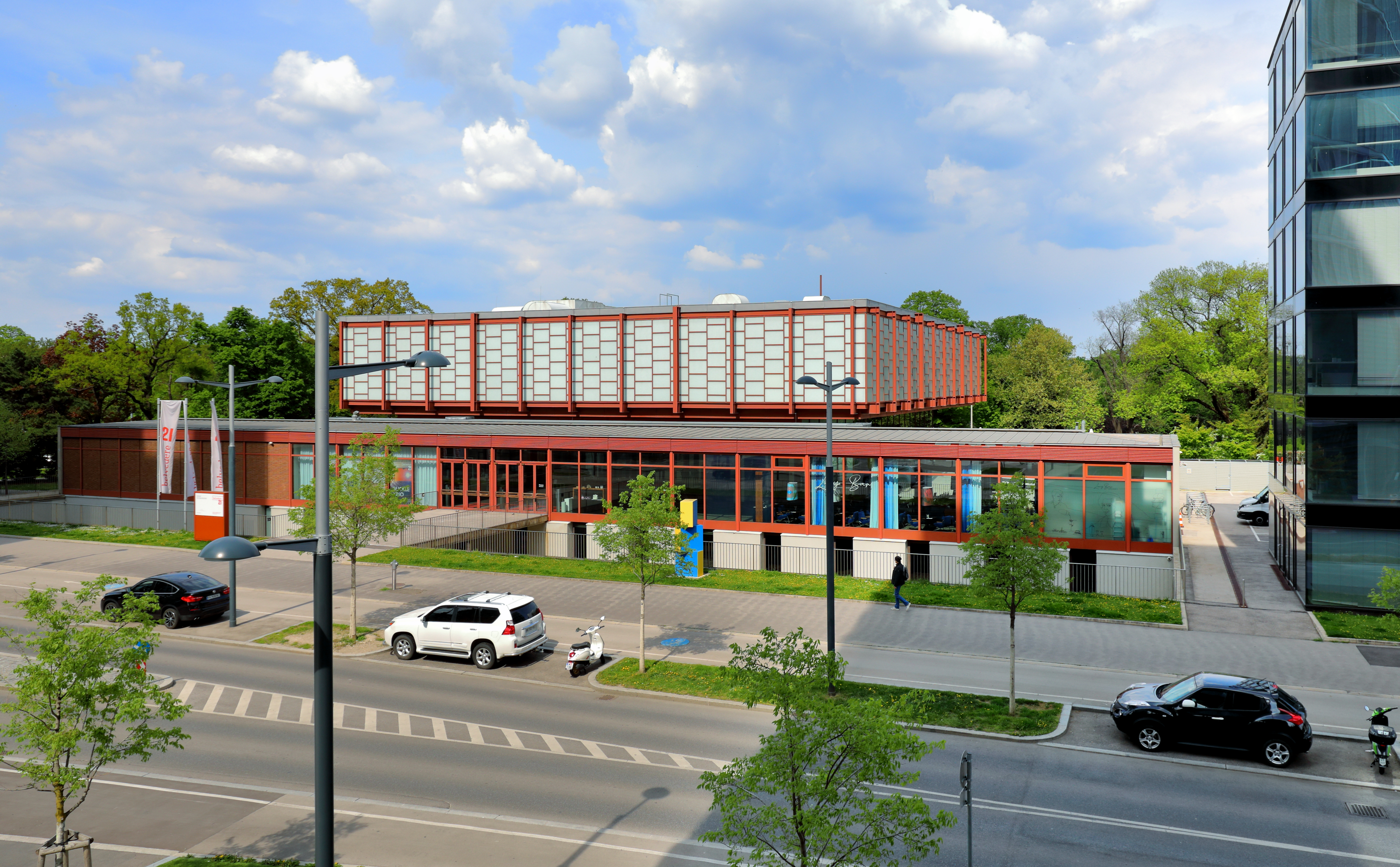
- Established: 1958 (reopened 2011) 1962 Museum des 20. Jahrhunderts (20er Haus); 1979–2001 Branch of the Museum of Modern Art; from 15 November 2011: Branch of the Österreichische Galerie Belvedere
- Location: Vienna, Austria
- Director: Agnes Husslein-Arco
- Website: belvedere.at/

Belvedere 21, formerly 21er Haus or Einundzwanziger Haus (English: House 21), is a modernist style steel and glass building designed by Austrian architect Karl Schwanzer (1918–1975). Originally constructed as the Austrian pavilion or temporary showroom for the Expo 58 in Brussels, it was later transferred to Vienna to house the Museum of the 20th Century, which explains why it was first nicknamed "20er Haus" (House 20). Between 1979 and 2001, the building also acted as a depository for contemporary art works. From 2009 to 2011, it was remodeled by the architect Adolf Krischanitz and consequently renamed 21er Haus to reflect the 21st century. It was renamed Belvedere 21 in 2018.

== History ==
=== Pavilion at the Expo in Brussels ===
Karl Schwanzer designed the building in 1954 for the Austrian government's design competition for the national pavilion at the 1958 World's fair in Brussels. In 1955 he was awarded the first prize of the jury, which included Josef Hoffmann. Schwanzer explained that maximum effects had to be achieved with minimum effort as the Austrian budget was tighter than those of most other countries participating at Expo 58. The starting point was to put man at the centre of cultural and intellectual progress, in line with the event's motto: "Striking a balance for a human world". The building was designed as a lightweight structure, its upper 40 by 40 metre floor, six meters above the ground, resting entirely on four buttresses creating a floating effect. Schwanzer was awarded the Grand Prix d'Architecture for his visionary design. Fritz Wotruba created the monumental figural relief which was installed in front of the pavilion, for which he received the award for the Expo's best artwork.

Schwanzer's ground-breaking minimalistic design is widely regarded as a masterpiece of modern architecture, created more than ten years before Ludwig Mies van der Rohe presented his iconic version of flexible interior space and transparent walls in the form of the Neue Nationalgalerie in Berlin. On 30 January 1958, the daily newspaper Die Presse described the exhibition hall as "a virtually ideal foundation for a Museum of Modern Art".

=== Museum of the 20th century ===
After the fair, the pavilion was transferred to Vienna to house the Museum of the 20th Century (M20). Hence, the building was widely referred to as "20er Haus" (House 20). Karl Schwanzer adapted the steel skeleton construction to the museum's purposes: the ground floor was glazed, the courtyard was covered with a roof, all façades were substantially modified, and the whole structure was reinstalled in the Schweizer Garten between Arsenal and the former Südbahnhof. The new museum was opened on 20 September 1962. It immediately became a hot spot of the Viennese art world.

One of the comments about the institution and its first exhibition, Art from 1900 to the Present, said that the museum represented such a break with the Viennese museum tradition "that one automatically felt as if on foreign territory when first entering the museum". The art historian Werner Hofmann wrote on the occasion of its opening:

This new building bears the signature of our age, and its spatial layout does justice to the fact that the art of this century displays a powerful and frequently aggressive self-confidence that calls for vastness and openness.

=== Modern art depository ===
Between 1979 and 2001 the building acted as a depository for contemporary art works, which were then moved to the newly established Museum of Modern Art at Museumsquartier in late 2001. The 20er Haus was finally incorporated into the Austrian Gallery Belvedere in the early summer of 2002. However, the Belvedere museum lacked the financial funds for the necessary restructuring. As a result, the building, which is a protected cultural heritage site stood empty for years.

== Renovation and reopening ==
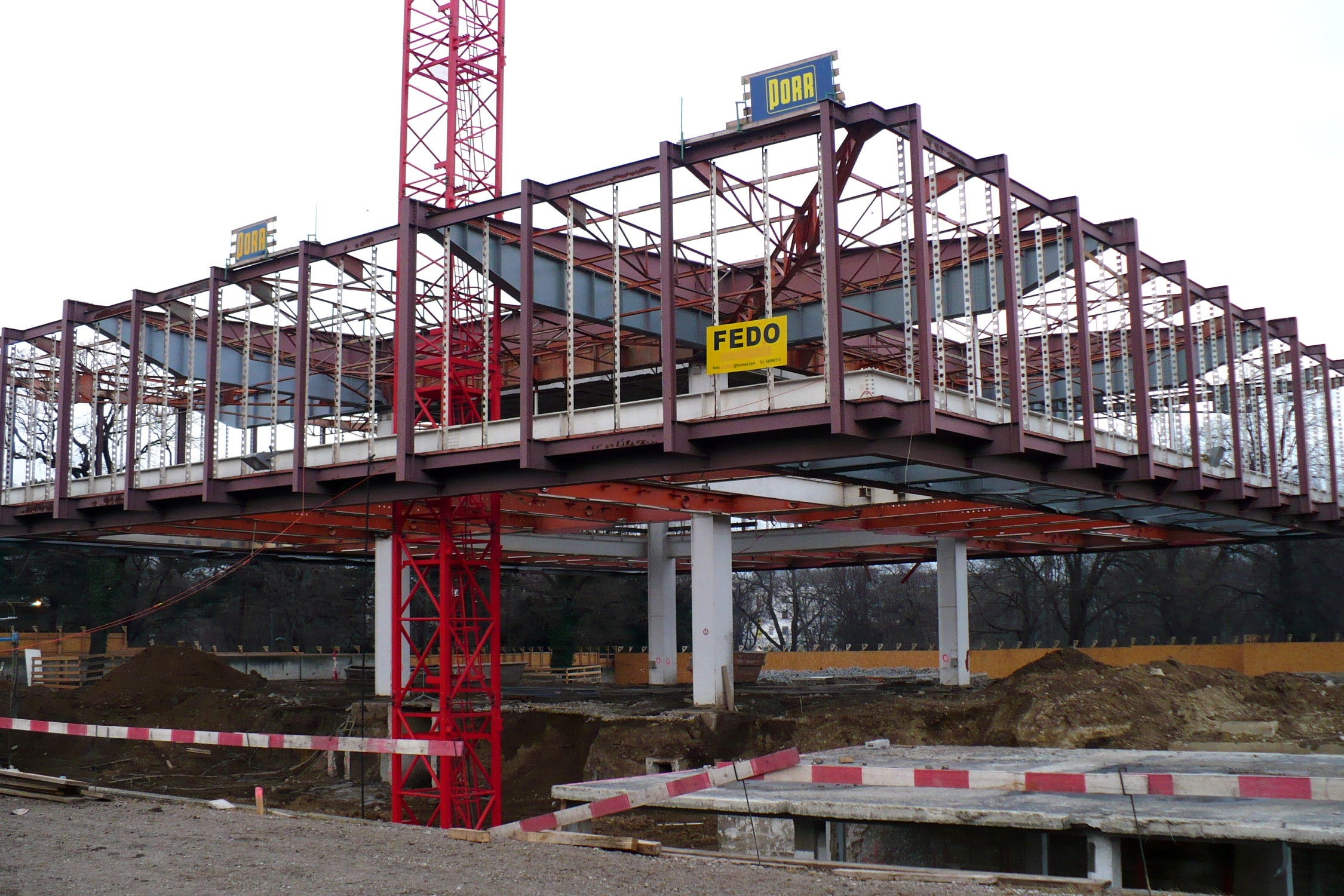
The building during the restoration work in 2009...

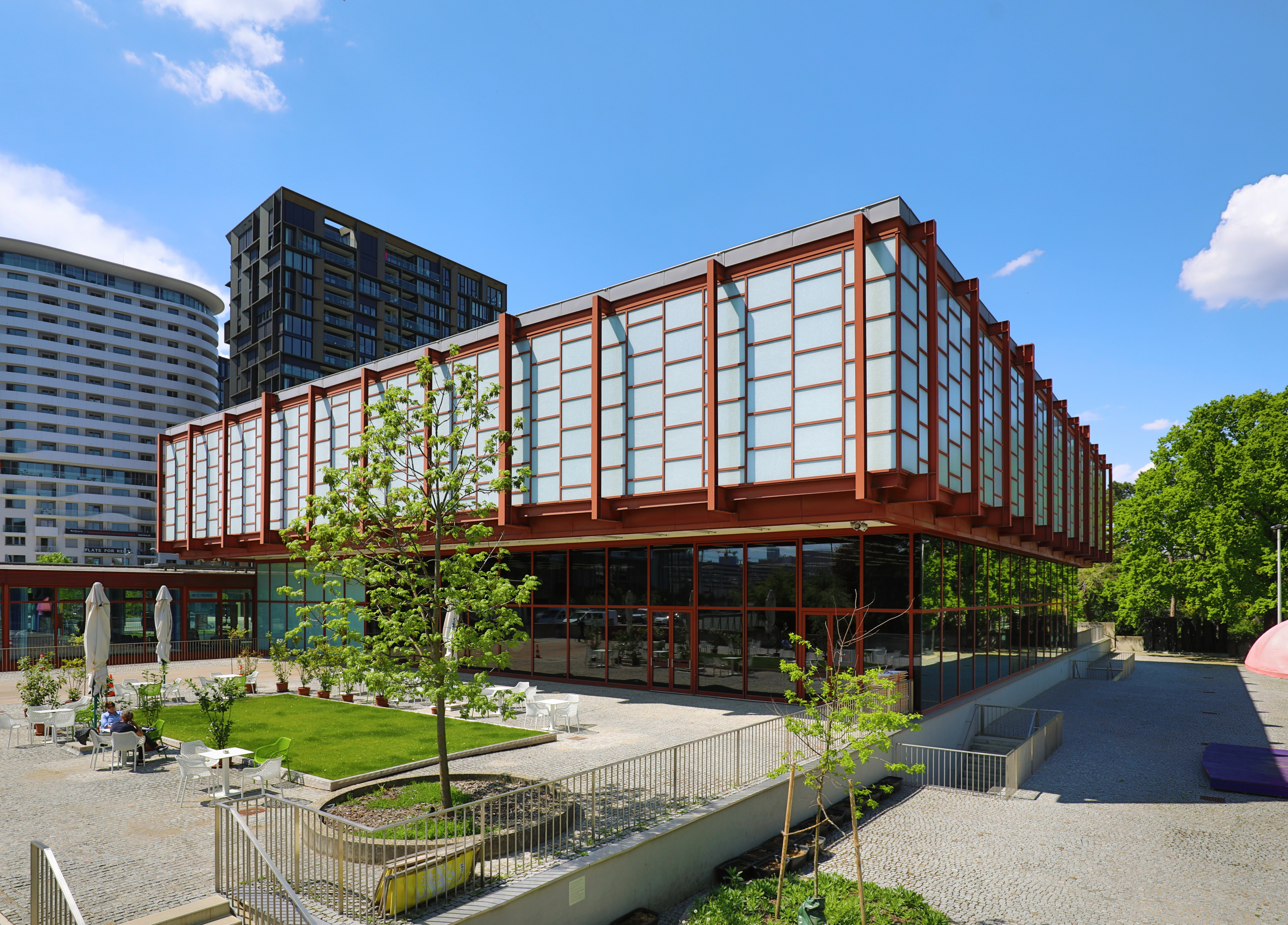
... and after the completion of the restoration work

On 13 June 2008, renovation work started under the supervision of Adolf Krischanitz, a former student of Karl Schwanzer at Vienna University of Technology. At a cost of 31.9 million euros, the carrying capacity of the steel structure was adapted to the requirements of the building code. The ceilings were cleaned of asbestos and the original glass roof was made shatterproof. The large window profiles were replaced with energy-saving double glazing. The work also entailed providing additional space by re-erecting the 75 meter long original porch from the 1960s and by lowering the area in front of the structure, transforming it into an atrium crossed by an access bridge. A six-storey office tower on the former parking lot was added with lettering describing the building's purpose. On 20 September 2011 Federal Minister Claudia Schmied attended the celebration of the completion of the building, following the awarding of the BC21 Art Award for young, innovative artists.

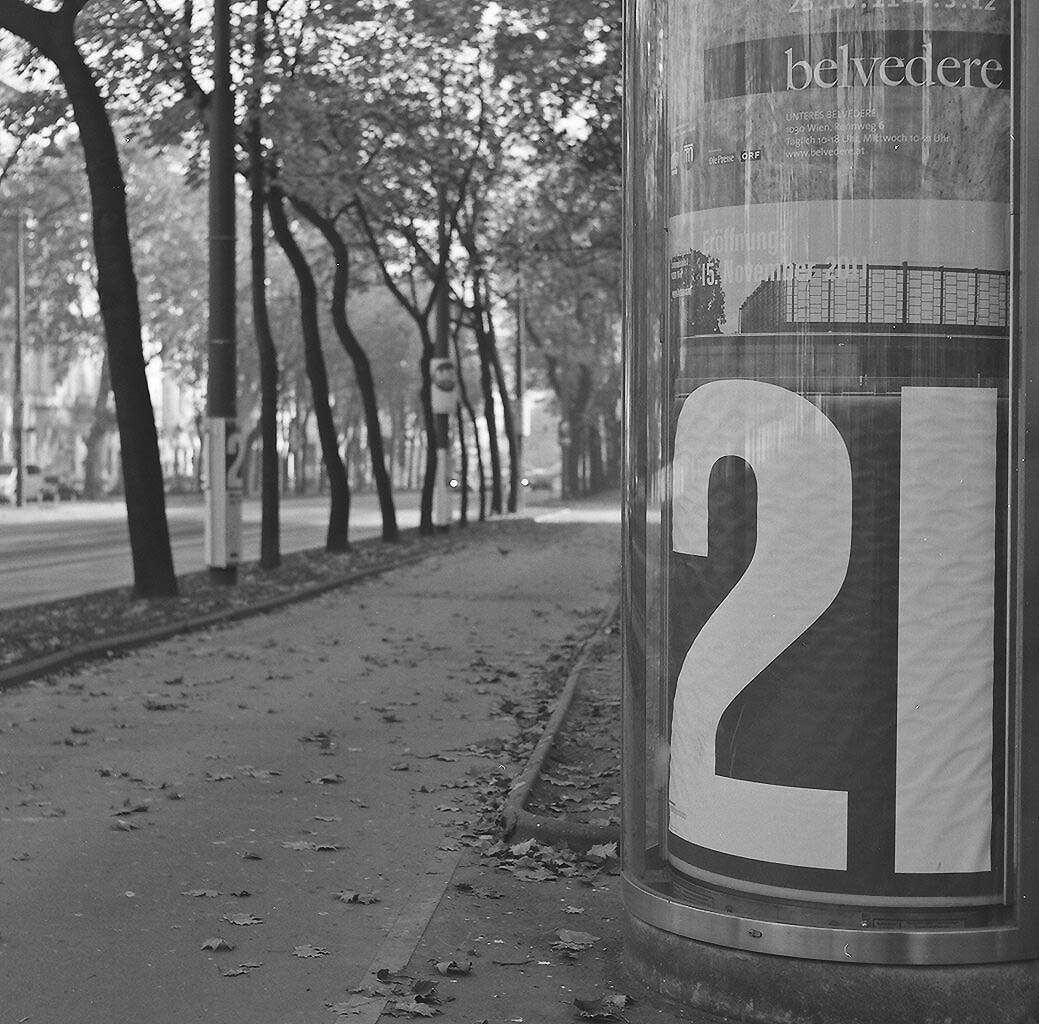
Billboard announcing the reopening of the museum

On 15 November 2011, the building was reopened after Krischanitz fitted it out as a museum with well organized exhibition spaces and a cinema. The overall effect is an open museum structure with a total of 2,275 m^{2} (24,500 square feet) exhibition space on the ground and upper floors. The exhibition space in the basement houses the permanent exhibits from the Wotruba Foundation (with some 500 works in stone, bronze, and plaster, 2,500 drawings, 1,500 prints, and 14 oil paintings) as well as a restaurant and an art studio for children. The shop of the Museum, the "Salon für Kunstbuch" (Salon for artistbooks) is an installation by the Austrian Artist Bernhard Chella that the 21er Haus bought in 2011. The Austrian Artothèque, which allows civil servants and publicly owned corporations to take out up to four artworks on loan for up to one year, will be located in the second basement and is open to the general public since September 2012. The new cinema with the original seating and paneling from Expo 58 opened in March 2012.

The museum is a branch of the Belvedere, focusing on "Austrian art of the twentieth and twenty-first centuries and its embedding in an international context". The opening exhibition under the title: "Schöne Aussichten" (English: fine prospects) presented artworks from Lucio Fontana, Andrea Fraser, Marcus Geiger, Florian Thorsen, Lois Weinberger, Franz West und Heimo Zobernig. There will be three large exhibitions per year open five days a week.

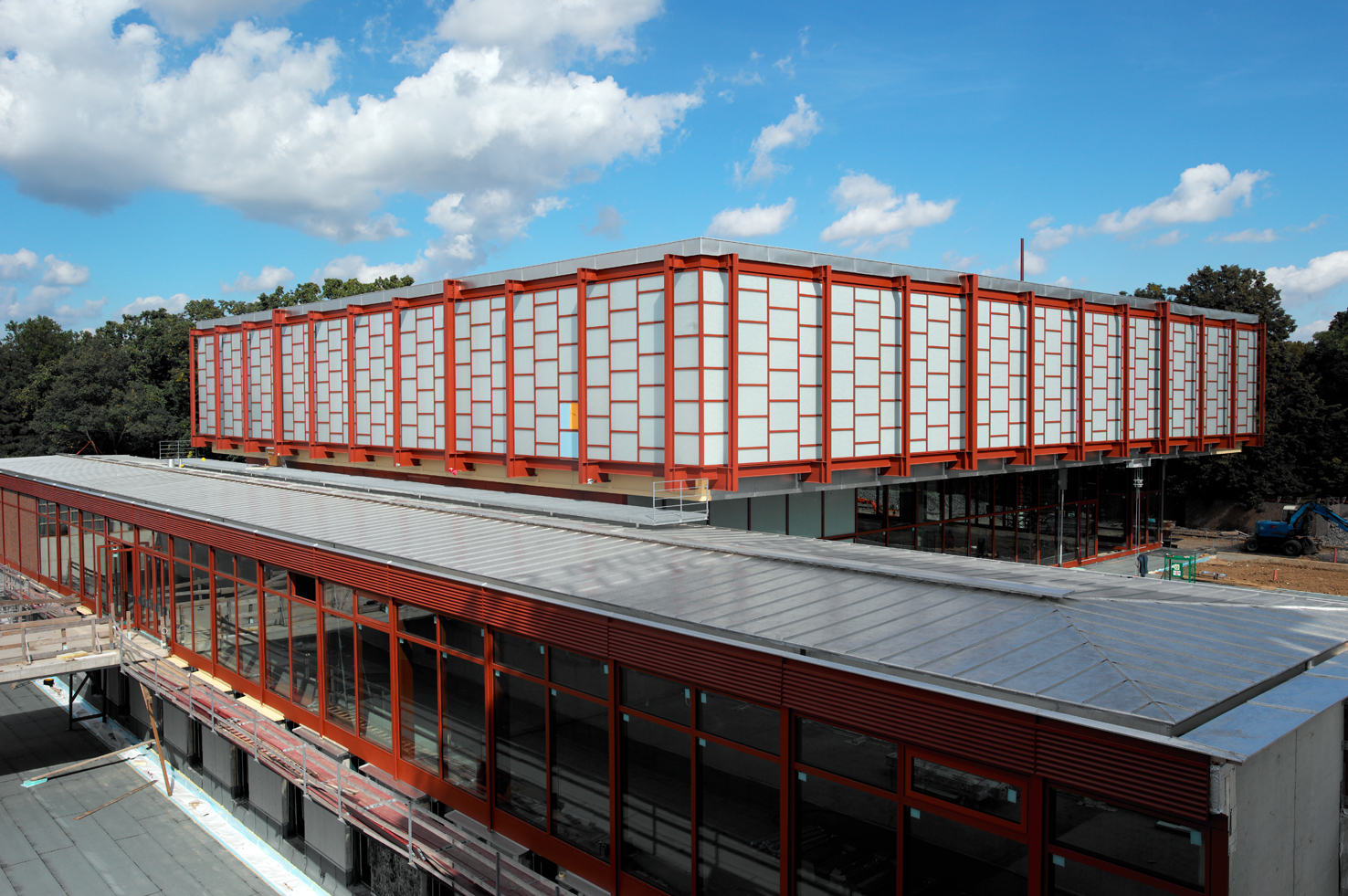
The building during its restoration in 2010

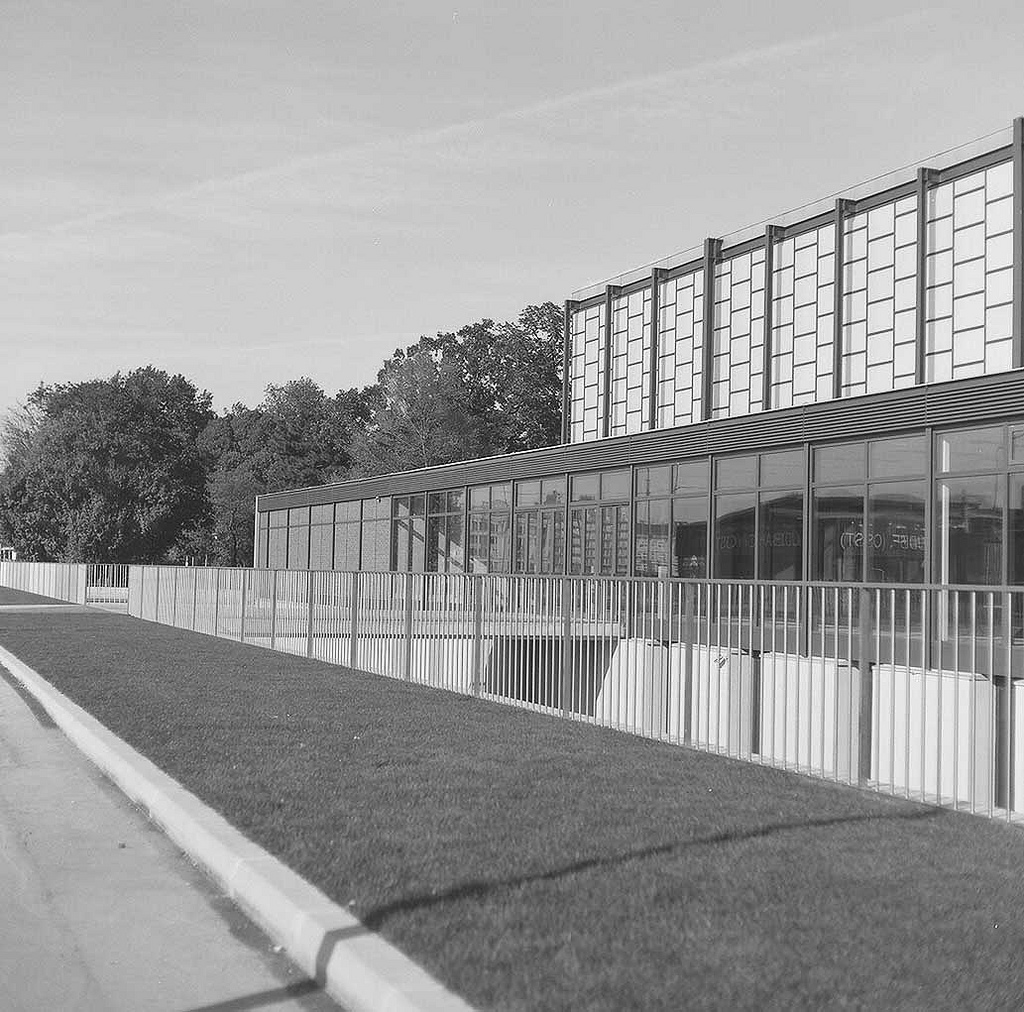
Façade

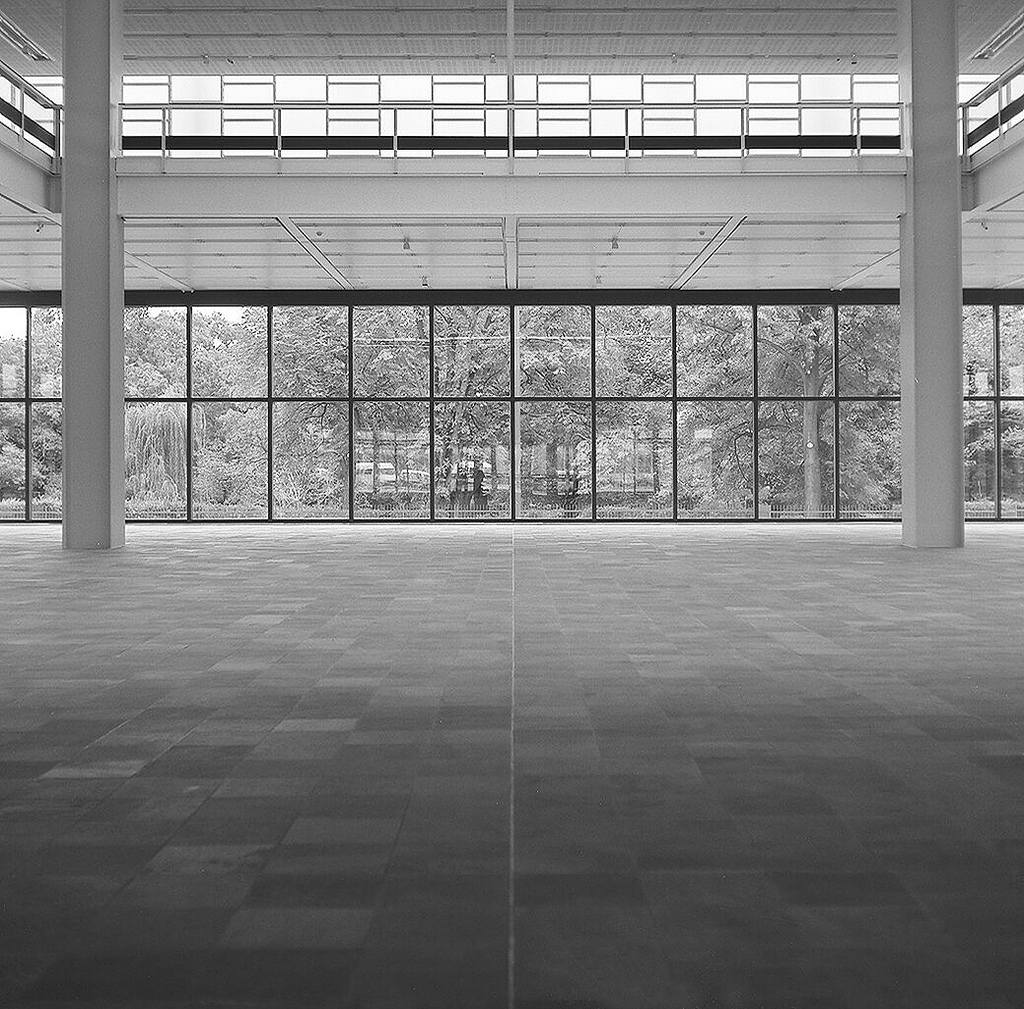
Ground floor

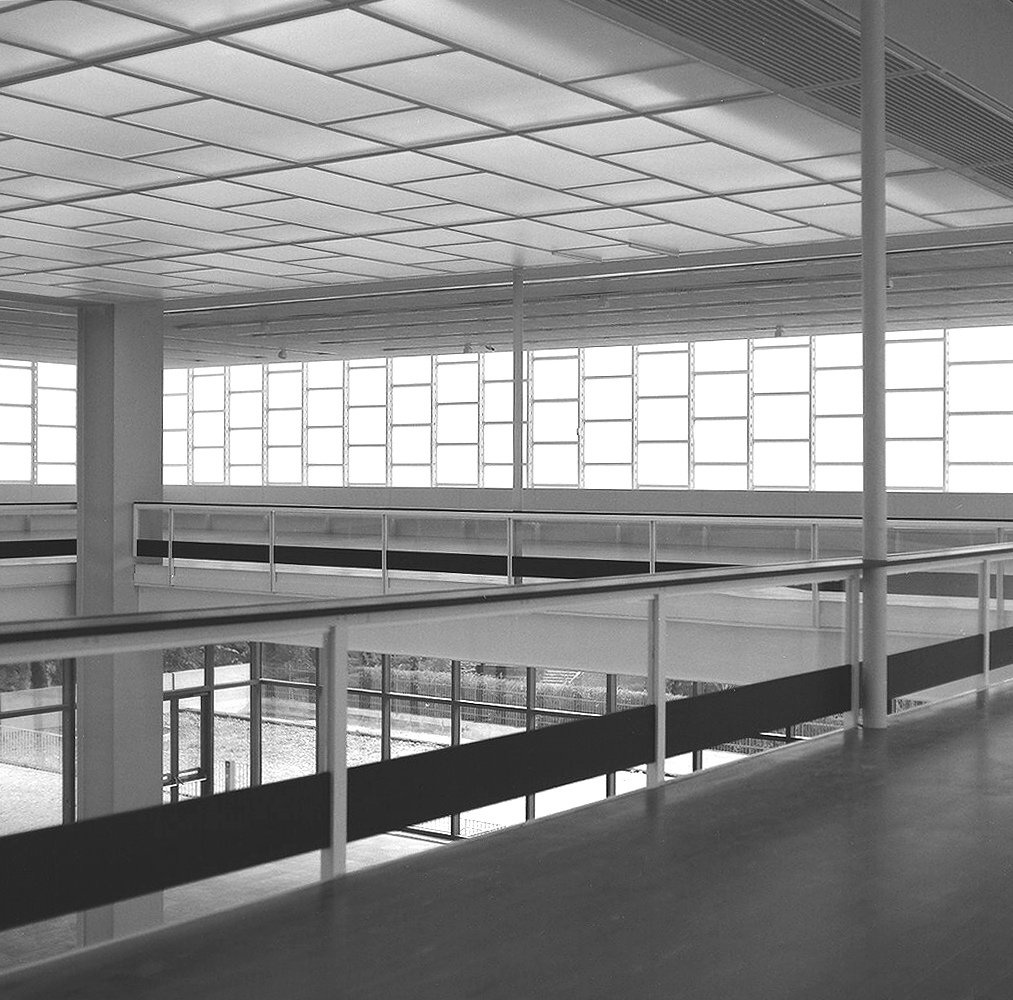
First floor

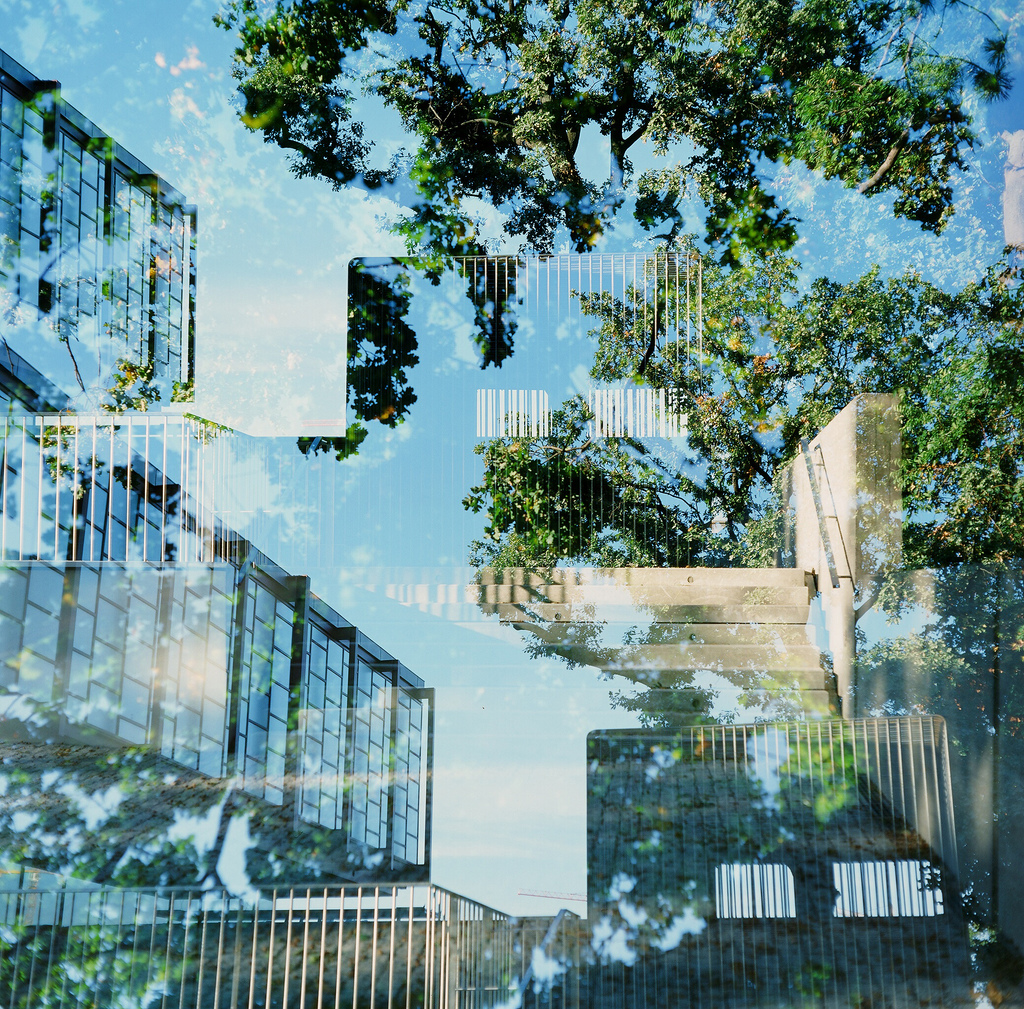
Reflections of the building, 2011
