= 5uper.net =

Artist collective based in Vienna

- Established: 2003
- Dissolved: 2016
- Type: Artist collective
- Purpose: Network cultures
- Headquarters: Museumsquartier
- Location: Vienna, Austria
- Website: 5uper.net

5uper.net was an international artist group and "incorporated society to research, promote and reflect on the intersections of media, arts, technology and society" which has been integrated into the organisation "Artistic Bokeh" in 2010 (which later was renamed the Research Institute for Arts and Technology). The group has worked with many internationally recognized artists, such as Peter Weibel, Ubermorgen as well as with relevant international institutions in arts and research, such as the Transmediale, the ISEA International, the Ludwig Boltzmann Institute, and the University of Applied Arts Vienna.

The group which had been operating out of the MuseumsQuartier in Vienna, Austria had focused on art-based research at the intersection of media, arts, technology, and society. The group was established in 2003 by Markus Hafner, Ile Cvetkoski, Matthias Tarasiewicz, Karina Lackner, and Michal Wlodkowski and was responsible for developing the Coded Cultures festival series as well as diverse projects and exhibitions on the intersection of arts and technology.
