= Television channel =

Frequency/channel over which a television station is distributed

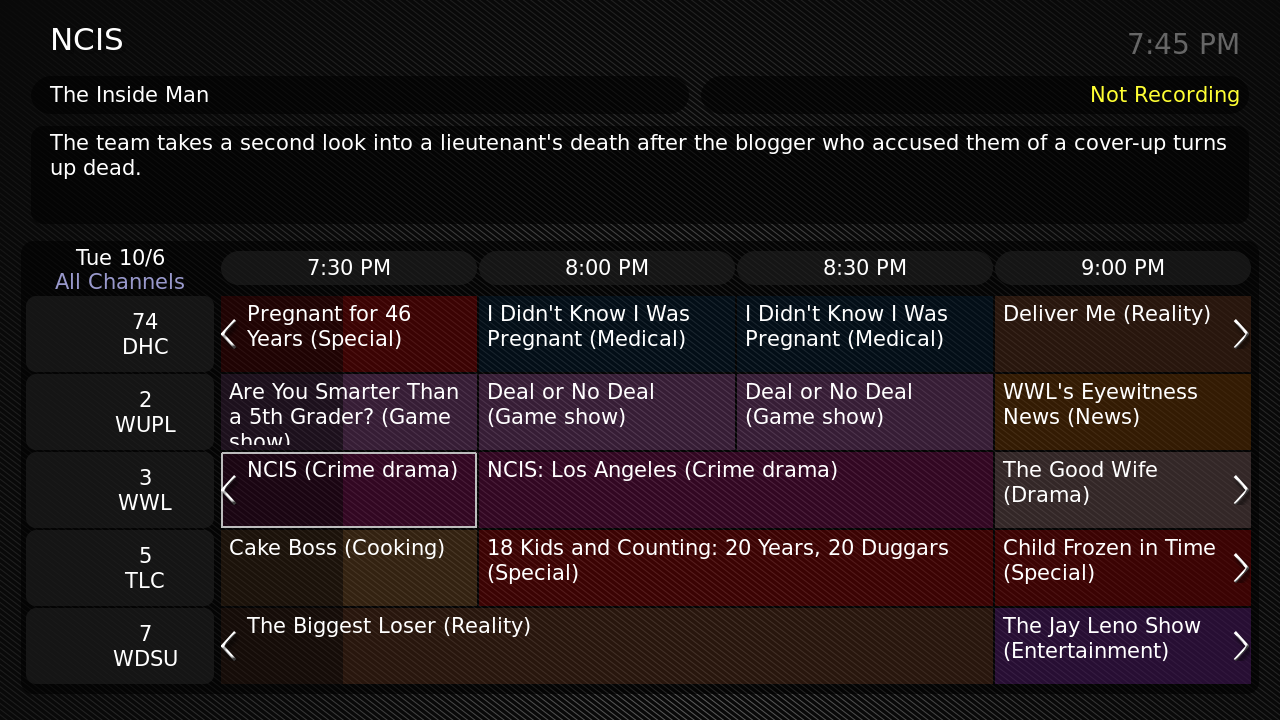
An electronic program guide showing television listings in New Orleans for broadcast and cable channels.

A television channel, or TV channel, is a terrestrial frequency or allocated number over which a television station or television network is distributed. For example, in the UK and North America, channel 2 refers to the terrestrial or cable band of 54 to 60 MHz, with carrier frequencies of 55.25 MHz for NTSC analog video (VSB) and 59.75 MHz for analog audio (FM), or 55.31 MHz for digital ATSC (8VSB). Channels may be shared by many different television stations or cable-distributed channels depending on the location and service provider.

Depending on the multinational bandplan for a given region, analog television channels are typically 6, 7, or 8 MHz in bandwidth, and therefore television channel frequencies vary as well. Channel numbering is also different. Digital terrestrial television channels are the same as their analog predecessors for legacy reasons, however through multiplexing, each physical radio frequency (RF) channel can carry several digital subchannels. On satellites, each transponder normally carries one channel, however multiple small, independent channels can be on one transponder, with some loss of bandwidth due to the need for guard bands between unrelated transmissions. ISDB, used in Japan and Brazil, has a similar segmented mode.

Preventing interference between terrestrial channels in the same area is accomplished by skipping at least one channel between two analog stations' frequency allocations. Where channel numbers are sequential, frequencies are not contiguous, such as channel 6 to 7 skip from VHF low to high band, and channel 13 to 14 jump to UHF. On cable TV, it is possible to use adjacent channels only because they are all at the same power, something which could only be done terrestrially if the two stations were transmitted at the same power and height from the same location. For DTT, selectivity is inherently better, therefore channels adjacent (either to analog or digital stations) can be used even in the same area.

== Other meanings ==
Commonly, the term television channel is used to mean a television station or its pay television counterpart (both outlined below). Sometimes, especially outside the U.S. and in the context of pay television, it is used instead of the term television network, which otherwise (in its technical use above) describes a group of geographically-distributed television stations that share affiliation/ownership and some or all of their programming with one another. This terminology may be muddled somewhat in other jurisdictions, for instance Europe, where terrestrial channels are commonly mapped from physical channels to common numerical positions (i.e. BBC One does not broadcast on any particular channel 1 but is nonetheless mapped to the 1 input on most British television sets). On digital platforms, such (location) channels are usually arbitrary and changeable, due to virtual channels.

=== Television station ===
A television station is a type of terrestrial station that broadcasts both audio and video to television receivers in a particular area. Traditionally, TV stations made their broadcasts by sending specially-encoded radio signals over the air, called terrestrial television. Individual television stations are usually granted licenses by a government agency to use a particular section of the radio spectrum (a channel) through which they send their signals. Some stations use LPTV broadcast translators to retransmit to further areas.

Many television stations are now in the process of converting from analog terrestrial (NTSC, PAL or SECAM) broadcast, to digital terrestrial (ATSC broadcast, DVB or ISDB).

=== Non-terrestrial television channels ===
Because some regions have had difficulty picking up terrestrial television signals (particularly in mountainous areas), alternative means of distribution such as direct-to-home satellite and cable television have been introduced. Television channels specifically built to run on cable or satellite blur the line between TV station and TV network. That fact led some early cable channels to call themselves superstations.

Satellite and cable have created changes. Local programming TV stations in an area can sign-up or even be required to be carried on cable, but content providers like TLC cannot. They are not licensed to run broadcast equipment like a station, and they do not regularly provide content to licensed broadcasters either. Furthermore, a distributor like TNT may start producing its own programming, and shows presented exclusively on pay-TV by one distributor may be syndicated to terrestrial stations. The cost of creating a nationwide channel has been reduced and there has been a huge increase in the number of such channels, with most catering to a small group.

From the definitions above, use of the terms network or station in reference to nationwide cable or satellite channels is technically inaccurate. However, this is an arbitrary, inconsequential distinction, and varies from company to company. Indeed, the term cable network has entered into common usage in the United States in reference to such channels, even with the existence of direct broadcast satellite. There is even some geographical separation among national pay television channels in the U.S., be it programming (e.g., the Bally Sports group of regional sports channels, which share several programs), or simply regionalized advertising inserted by the local cable company.

Should a legal distinction be necessary between a (location) channel as defined above and a television channel in this sense, the terms programming service (e.g.) or programming undertaking (for instance,) may be used instead of the latter definition.

== See also ==
- Barker channel
- Free-to-air
- Lists of television channels
- Pay television
- Streaming television
- Television channel frequencies
