= AZW =

AZW or azw may refer to:

- Air Zimbabwe, or AZW in the ICAO airline code
- .azw, file format used by the Amazon Kindle e-Book reader
- Architekturzentrum Wien, part of Museumsquartier in Vienna
