= Research Institute for Arts and Technology =

Organization exercising epistemic philosophies

- Abbreviation: RIAT
- Predecessor: 5uper.net
- Formation: 2012
- Merger of: Artistic Bokeh; Artistic Technology Lab
- Type: Non-profit organization
- Legal status: Active
- Location: Vienna, Austria
- Fields: Open Hardware; Publishing; Cryptocurrencies; Media art
- Website: riat.at

The Research Institute for Arts and Technology (RIAT) is an independent and international research institute established in 2012 in Austria and operating internationally. The aim of the institute is to investigate how technology and art can relate and inform each other in areas that include: open hardware, publishing, epistemic culture, cryptocurrencies and the blockchain. In 2017 RIAT was recognized by the European Commission and Ars Electronica for innovation at the interface of science, technology and art with a STARTS Prize Honorary Mention.

== History ==
The organisation began as Artistic Bokeh in 2012. It established itself as the Research Institute for Arts and Technology in 2015 after artists Bernhard Cella and Matthias Tarasiewicz made a decision to depart the University of Applied Arts Vienna. Since 2012 Cella and Tarasiewicz had both been leading research projects supported by the Austrian Science Fund at the Center of Art and Knowledge Transfer within the University of Applied Arts Vienna. Alongside the projects that were relocated from the University of Applied Arts Vienna, the other Viennese art initiatives Coded Cultures, 5uper.net and Artistic Bokeh were also integrated into the institute.

In July 2018, RIAT researcher Andrew Newman announced at the Gray Area Festival that the institute now refers to itself as the RIAT Institute for Future Cryptoeconomics although it is still legally named Research Institute for Arts and Technology. Since then the institute has predominantly focused on blockchain and cryptocurrency research, joining a consortium of Austrian research institutions to establish the Austrian Blockchain Center. In November 2018 the Austrian Blockchain Center received €20 million in funding from the Austrian Research Promotion Agency and is described as the world's largest blockchain competence center. RIAT leads the research area Data Science Methods for Blockchain Analytics & Predictions in partnership with the Austrian Institute of Technology.

RIAT has organized and participated in numerous international conferences on the topics of hacker culture, cypherpunk, and open source hardware.

RIAT yearly organizes the Critical Decentralization Cluster at C3 (Chaos Communication Congress), and is an official cluster (orbit) since 2018. Since January 2026 RIAT also co-organizes the Decentralized Internet and Privacy Devroom at FOSDEM.

== Artist-in-Residence Program ==
RIAT runs an artist-in-residence program with the MuseumsQuartier in Vienna that focuses on research practices at the intersection of arts and technology. The residency program started in 2005 through 5uper.net and continued in 2012 with Artistic Bokeh. In 2016 the residency program was expanded through a new partnership between the Research Institute for Arts and Technology and the Museumsquartier. In 2017, RIAT shifted the focus of the residency program to inviting artists, researchers and developers working in cryptoeconomics.
