= ESeL =

eSeL is an art platform in Vienna, Austria. Founded 1998 by Lorenz Seidler, it provides a weekly newsletter "eSeL Mehl", various mailing lists, a photo-archive and an event-database. The label "eSeL" is also serving as a nickname for the artist Lorenz Seidler (originating in the phonetic pronunciation of his initials), who also is initiating, curating and conducting various art projects. eSeL's offices are located at Museumsquartier in Vienna.

== About eSeL ==
The label eSeL (also serving as a nickname of founder Lorenz Seidler) represents the crossover of the roles of artist, curator, online medium and infrastructure-provider in contemporary artistic practice in the new media genres.

"Esel" means "donkey" in German. The label originates in the phonetic pronunciation of its founder's initials and soon became a standalone brand, expanding its animal analogies into a multitude of animals-participants. Qualities attributed to the eponymous animal are consciously matching with the initiative's characteristics: stubbornness (autonomy and independence), grey fur (searching for options beyond the polarity of right/wrong or good/bad), long ears (overhearing insider's information), asininity (asking alleged “stupid” questions).

eSeL aims at revealing and changing conventions and coherence in the art field, putting a special focus on structural implications and representation in the media sphere.

"Kunst kommt von Kommunizieren" ("art derives from communication") is eSeL's slogan - Contributions of the term "art" are shown as a constant process of (transitory) quality agreements.

The eSeL-initiative grew from an independent online medium for of art information and event listings to an institutional carrier and server for art activities in Vienna, combined with focused interventions through projects, performances, and exhibitions.

Reaching a young audience beyond the art circles, eSeL's information services deliberately feature upcoming initiatives next to well-established art positions from all fields of artistic practice in Vienna (Fine Arts, performance, dance, art-in-public space, film, media art, music and civil society's artistic activities, inviting participation by new artists as well as the audience).

== eSeL art events database as Digital Cultural Heritage ==
Since 2023 the art events and calendar data provided via eSeL.at are made accessible to the public as well as for academic use as part of Europe’s digital cultural heritage. In Austria, these Europeana archive data can be accessed through the platform Kulturpool.at.

== Website ==
The website www.eSeL.at offers a selected database/calendar covering art events in Vienna and surrounding areas, a weekly newsletter ("eSeL Mehl") as well as a photo archive. The calendar eSeL.at is divided into daily overviews by date and into the categories "eSeL Neugierde" (editorial recommendation), "hAmSteR Events" (scene), „Maultier Kunst" (fine art), "Uhu Diskurs" (discourse / mediation), "Ameisen Urbanismus" (Architecture / City), "Nerz Techleben" (Internet / Technology), "Flimmer Ratte" (Film / Video Art), "Kanari Klangwelten" (Sound Art / Music), "Tauben Loge" (Performance / Choreography), "Pudel Design" (design), "Public Access" (society / participation), "Eselchen Kinderprogramm" (children / family) and „nicht in Wien“ (not in Vienna).

The addition of Social Media functionality to the eSeL-Website ("eSeL 2.0.") was awarded the second prize at the "IG Kultur Wien Innovation Award 2010".

== Newsletter "eSeL Mehl" ==
The newsletter „eSeL Mehl“ is sent out every Thursday and offers an excerpt from the eSeL.at event database for the next seven days. The newsletter reaches over 10,000 subscribers weekly (February 2017). Each issue contains a photo selection compiled by Lorenz "eSeL" Seidler from the photographic documentation of current exhibitions and art events.

== "eSeL RECEPTION" in MuseumsQuartier ==
The "eSeL RECEPTION" at Q21 at the MuseumsQuartier supplements esel.at since 2011 as an "open office" with an "analogue" information portal and with an exhibition and workshop area. It offers, among other things, a library with exhibition catalogs as well as a moderated flyer box. The eSeL reception serves as a low-threshold mediation of art-happenings for the visitors of the MuseumsQuartier and as a venue for events such as the series "Kunst & SpieleN".

== Projects (selection) ==
Solo exhibitions:

- 2018 "love me sensor, #SupersensorKart"
- 2017 "Die Entsetzliche-Kunst-Tauschbörse", OK Linz & Dreisechsfuenf Vienna
- 2016 "Skandal Normal", OK Linz
- 2016 "Die Sammlung eSeL" (The eSeL Collection), Essl Museum
- 2015 "eSeL ́s Fotosalon Seidler" (eSeL's photo-lounge Seidler), Christine König Galerie
- 2015 "MIY Festival", Q21 - MuseumsQuartier
- 2012 "MULTImART", Viennafair
- 2011 "METAmART" - Kunst & Kapital (Art & Capital), Künstlerhaus Wien
- 2008-2009 "OPEN UP Kommunikation", Tanzquartier Wien
- 2007-2010 "ARTmART", Künstlerhaus Wien
- 2005 "UPDATE. Kunstrukturenutzen & schaffen", Künstlerhaus Wien

Group exhibitions:

- "10 Min Shift" at WUK, Vienna

Performances:

- 22.6. &6.7 2018 "eSeL ABC" - Show, in the context of „Ins Freie“ and „Bachmannpreis im Lendhafen“

Infrastructure projects:

- 2010–2011 GAZEBO. Galerie für öffentliche Räume (Institution)
- 2004 netznetz.net - Festival der Netzkulturen (Institution)
- 2002–2003 e-basis-wien_MQ (Institution)
- 1999–2002 "Radio eSeL. Die Sendung mit dem Schaf" auf Radio Orange 94.0 (Media)
- since 1999 www.esel.at (Media)

Audio projects:

- 2006 "Ich bin sh". eSeL remixed statements by Austrian net artists, activists and technicians to research, create and perform the projection of the role, issues and problems of a typical Austrian net culture artist. Audio
- 2005 "Update LeitFragen". Interactive Audio-Guide: Exhibition visitors could call via their mobile phones and answer questions to each exhibit of the UPDATE-exhibition. with Team Teichenberg and T-Systems Austria. Team Teichenberg
- 2005 "Add on Audio". Phrases from interviews were broadcast during the evening program of the art-in-public-space project “ADD ON. 20 Höhenmeter”. The final remix was documenting emerging issues of a six-week residence of artists, architects and visitors in a scaffolding tower in a public square in Vienna. (two tracks remixed by twisted noodle) Audio
- 2005 "Be a reporter". Interactive audience participation via mobile phone and broadcast via radio in the science event “Lange Nacht der Forschung”. with Team Teichenberg and T-Systems Austria.
- 2004 "Radio Republic". Daily radioshow and interventions as “State Secretary for Media Embedment” in the artists´ republic "State of the Arts" during the “Sommerzene Salzburg” Festival (President: Meg Stuart) | Audio
- 2004 "Radio Re Vu". Audiotour and various audio-interventions in public spaces in Kortrijk (Belgium) during the “Maison Folie” of the European Cultural Capitol 2004: Lille Buda Audio
- 2004 "UPDATE. The Album". Collaborative Music project. Musicians had to share audio samples and use them for songs about the exhibition. with Roger Stein and all participating artists. Roger-Stein.com
- 2003 "Hör Schau Schau". Audiocatalogue. Interviews and songs to the exhibition. with Roger Stein. Hilger gallery Audio
- 1999–2003 "Radio eSeL: Die Sendung mit dem Schaf". Biweekly radio show with guests and Call-Ins on Viennese radio station Radio Orange 94,0. Co-host: Sarah Pichler

== Awards ==
- 2018 Binsh Award
- 2010 Innovation Prize of the City of Vienna
- 2009 Departure Call "Focus Kunst“
