= Adolf Krischanitz =

Austrian-born architect (born 1946)

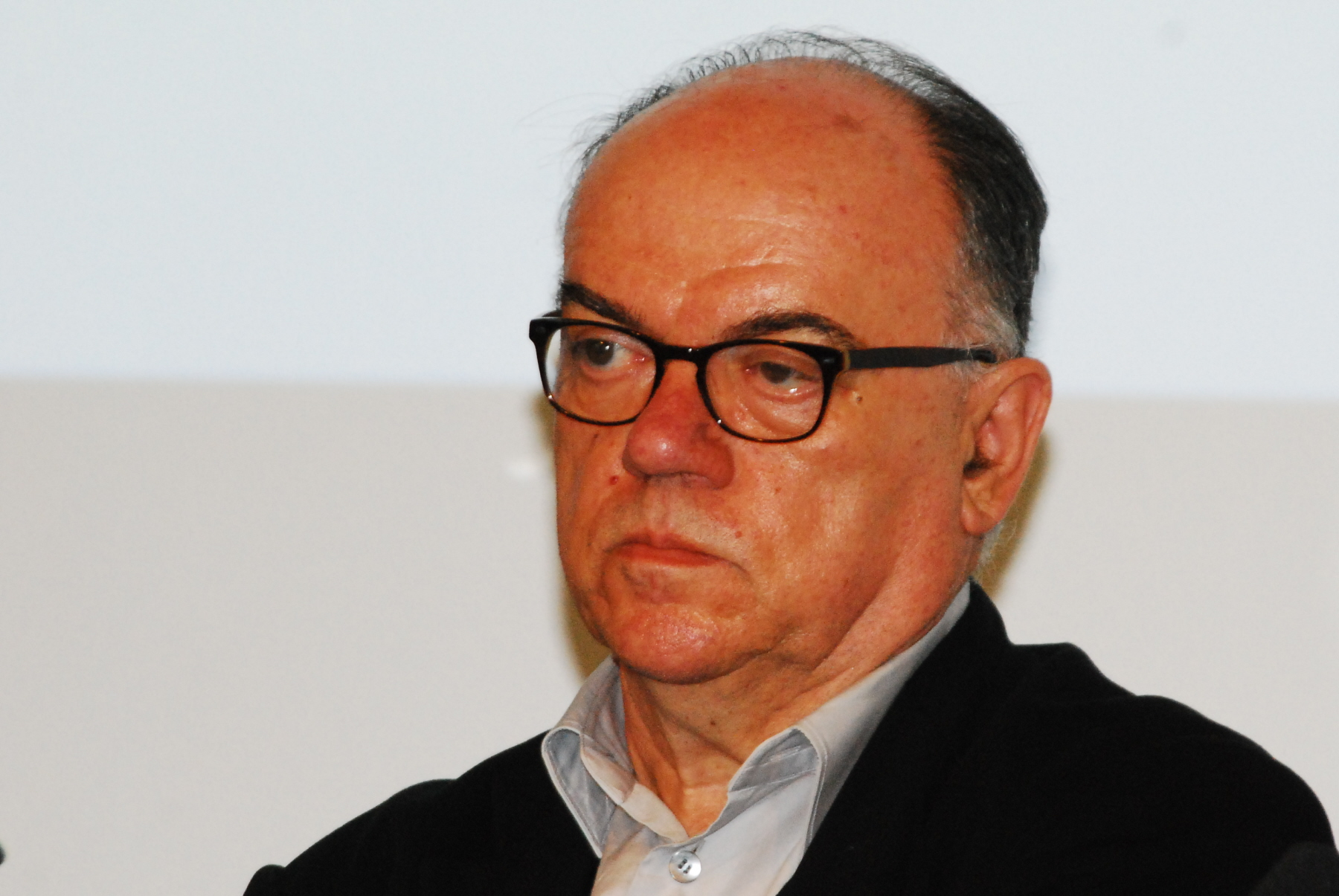
- Krischanitz in 2012
- Born: 26 May 1946 (age 80); Schwarzach im Pongau, Austria
- Occupation: Architect
- Practice: Krischanitz & Frank
- Buildings: Museum Rietberg, Zurich, Switzerland (2007)

Adolf Krischanitz (born 26 May 1946) is an Austrian-born architect.

== Biography ==
Krischanitz was born in Schwarzach im Pongau, Salzburg, Austria. He studied architecture at the Vienna University of Technology from 1965 to 1972.

=== Academic career ===
From 1974 through 1987 he was a lecturer at the Academy of Fine Arts Vienna, and from 1988 to 1989, a guest professor at the Technical University of Munich.

Since 1992, he has been a professor of design and urban development at the Berlin University of the Arts.

=== Professional career ===
Krischanitz has been a freelance architect in Vienna since 1979, the same year in which he co-founded the magazine UM BAU (About Building).

He served as the chairman of the Austrian Society for Architecture in 1982, and from 1991 to 1995 he was president of the Vienna Secession, a post first held by Gustav Klimt, one of the organization's co-founders.

In 2004 he became a partner and managing director of the architecture firm Krischinatz & Frank.

== Works ==
- 1992: Kunsthalle Wien project space, Vienna
- 1992–95: Kunsthalle Krems, reconstruction of a former tobacco factory
- 1992–96: Lauder Chabad Campus in Vienna
- 2002–07: Museum Rietberg, additional complex (in co-operation with Alfred Grazioli)
- 2008: Temporary Kunsthalle Berlin, later transferred to the Museum of Modern Art in Warsaw
- 2008–10: 20er Haus in Vienna, reconstruction of the Austrian pavilion at the Expo 58 in Brussels
