= Masaki Fujihata =

Japanese artist (born 1956)

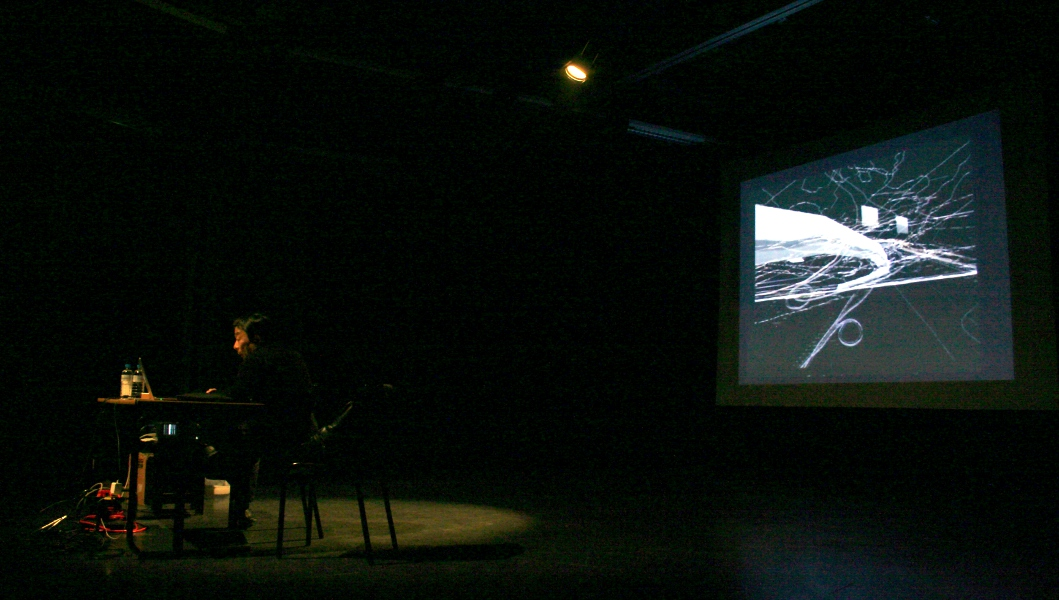
Masaki Fujihata lecturing in Paris 8 University (Saint-Denis, France)

Masaki Fujihata (Japanese: 藤幡正樹, Hepburn: Fujihata Masaki; born 1956) is a Japanese sound, installation, and interactive artist. He is a professor at Keio University.
