= Architekturzentrum Wien =

Coordinates: 48°12′15″N 16°21′28″E

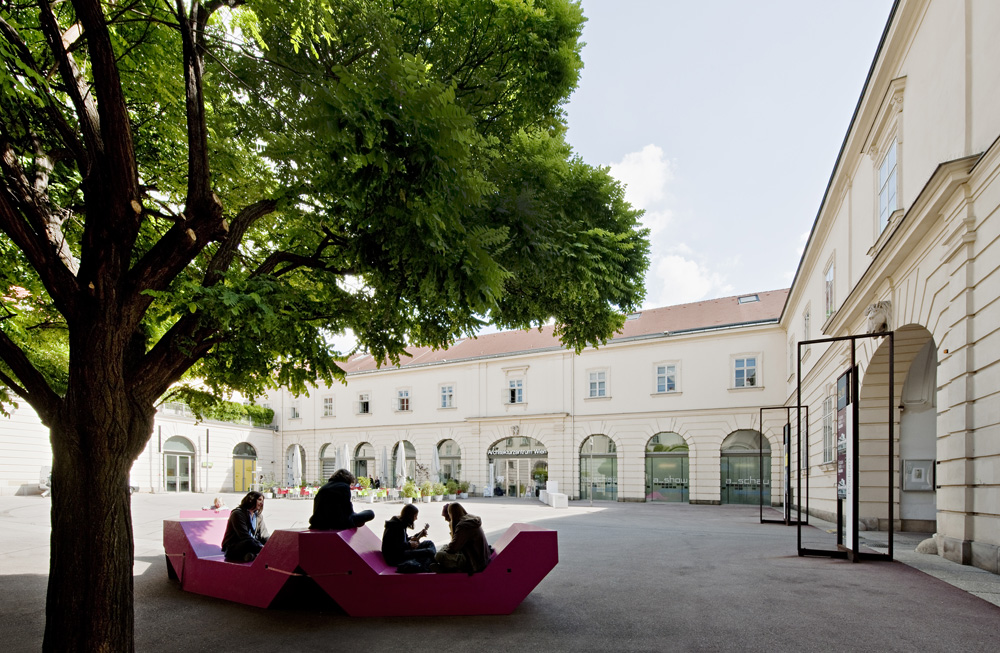
Entrance to the museum

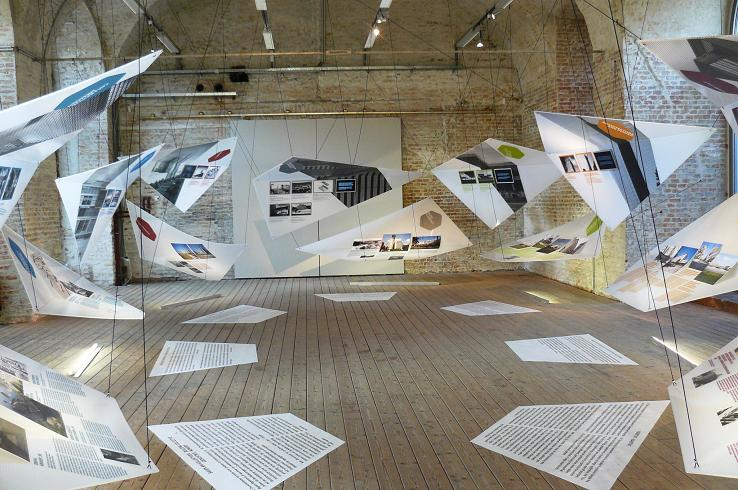
Part of an exhibition

The Architekturzentrum Wien (Az W) is a museum in Vienna, in the Museumsquartier. It is conceived as a centre for exhibitions, events and research into architecture and related topics, particularly the architecture and urban design of the 20th and 21st centuries. It is the national architecture museum of Austria.

== History ==
The centre was founded in 1993 as a non-profit organisation. It arose from a collaboration between the national government of Austria and the city of Vienna, and is jointly operated by the Federal Ministry of Education, Art and Culture and Vienna's offices of culture and urban development.

After eight years in temporary exhibition venues in the Museumsquartier, the Az W moved into its present location in 2001. It has around 1,000 m^{2} of exhibition space at its disposal, and organised over 150 exhibitions, 300 events and 600 architectural excursions in its first 15 years.

== Activities ==
The permanent exhibition "a_schau. Österreichische Architektur im 20. und 21. Jahrhundert" displays the history of Austrian architecture from 1850 to the present. The changing exhibitions present contemporary architecture, offering new perspectives on architectural history and future developments.

Through a range of events and activities, architecture is presented as a "cultural discipline, everyday phenomenon and complex process". These events include professional presentations and seminars, guided tours, children's workshops, publications, and the annual Vienna Architecture Congress. The museum's cafe and restaurant, MILO, is also well known for its interior design.

The documentary and research department operates a specialist non-lending library with 27,000 architectural titles, as well as an online architecture database and lexicon (Architektur Archiv Austria and online-Architektenlexikon) and an archive and collection relating to 20th- and 21st-century architecture.
