= Kunsthalle Wien =

Exhibition hall in Vienna

Coordinates: 48°12′12″N 16°21′33″E

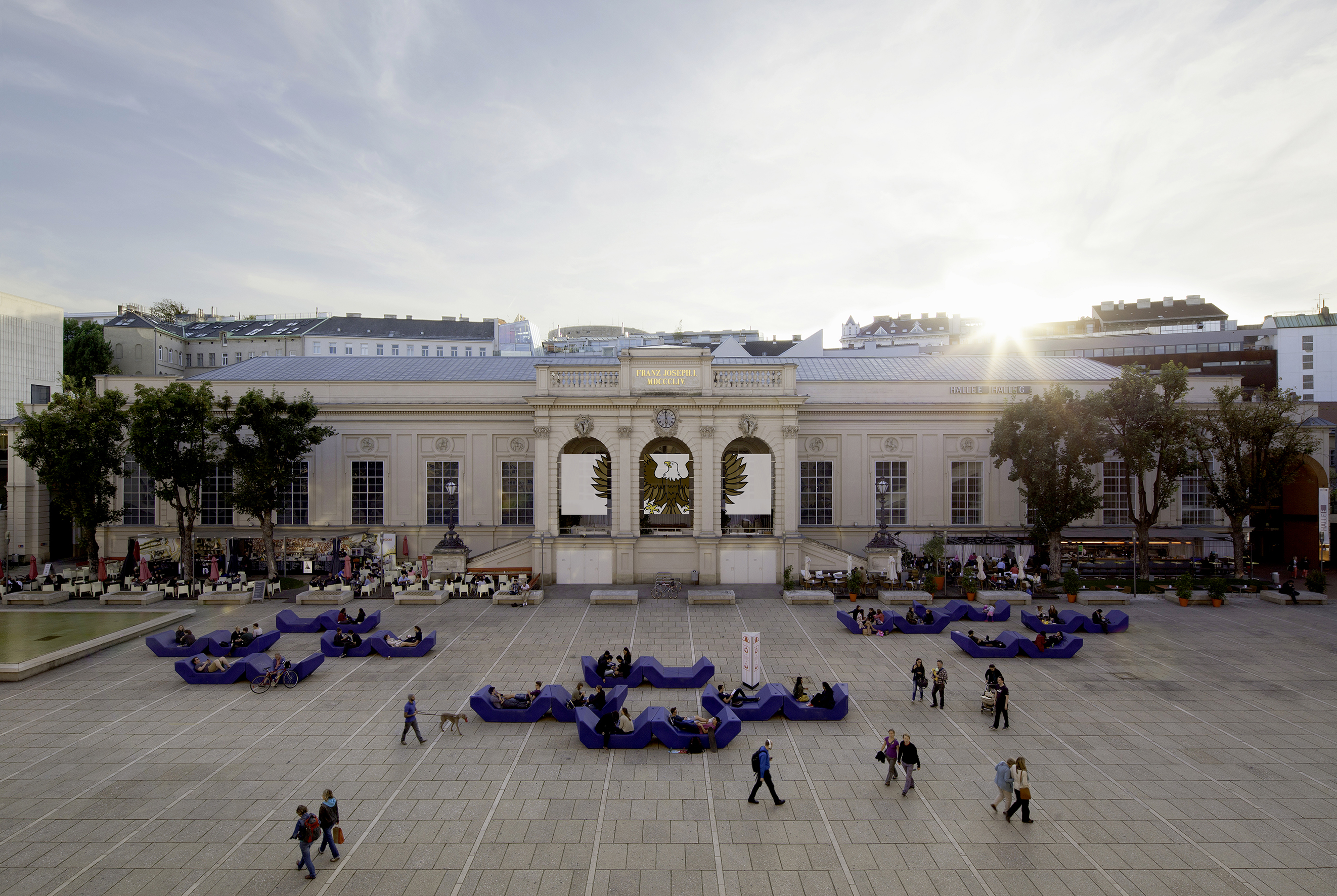
Kunsthalle Wien Museumsquartier

Kunsthalle Wien is the city of Vienna's institution for international contemporary art and discourse with two locations, in the Museumsquartier and at Karlsplatz. Kunsthalle Wien does not have a collection of its own, but instead dedicates its changing solo and thematic exhibitions to art and its relations to social change. It produces exhibitions, researches art practices, and supports local and international artists. It seeks to ground its knowledge of international contemporary art in and for Vienna, and advocates for the usefulness of artistic thinking in the wider public sphere.

== History and architecture ==
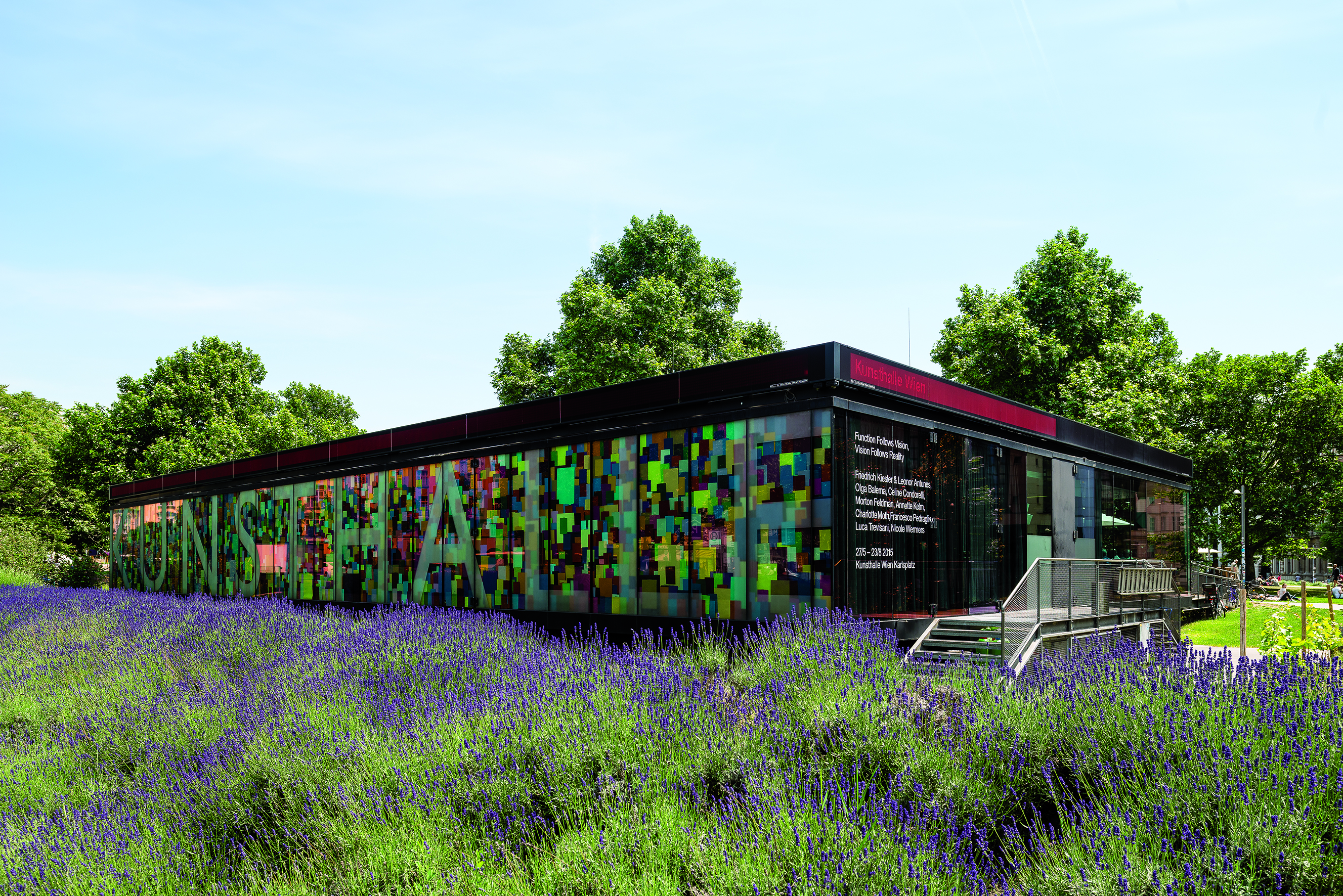
Kunsthalle Wien Karlsplatz

Since it opened in 1992 – originally shaped like a container – Kunsthalle Wien, as an urban institution, presents national and international contemporary art. In this respect, it is both a location for established art and negotiation site for current societal issues as well as future developments.

In the beginning, Kunsthalle Wien was a makeshift structure situated at Karlsplatz. Conceptualized as a temporary edifice in the shape of a container by Adolf Krischanitz. The initially rather controversial yellow container structure eventually changed the local art and exhibition scene.

In May 2001, Kunsthalle Wien moved into its new headquarters, designed by the architect duo Ortner & Ortner, at the Museumsquartier. For this headquarters the Winterreithalle (winter riding arena) of the Hofstallungen (imperial mews) was extended by a functional annex which combines the historic building with contemporary architecture. Two halls with different interior profiles provide space for exhibitions of contemporary art. The entrance area was remodelled and the building extensively renovated in 2013, rendering the original spatial concept visible again. In 2001, the yellow container at Karlsplatz was replaced by a glass pavilion.

== Directors ==
- since summer 2024: Michelle Cotton
- 2019–2024: WHW (What, How and for Whom): Ivet Ćurlin, Nataša Ilić and Sabina Sabolović
- 2012–2019: Nicolaus Schafhausen
- 1996–2012: Gerald Matt
- 1992–1995: Toni Stoos

== Exhibitions ==
Kunsthalle Wien organizes several thematic group exhibitions, solo shows, festivals, conferences, and displays art in the public space each year at both venues. Among them:

- Radical Software: Women, Art & Computing 1960–1991 (February – May 2025)
- Diego Marcon. La Gola (October 2024 – February 2025)
- Aleksandra Domanović (September 2024 – January 2024)
- Rene Matić / Oscar Murillo. JAZZ. (March – July 2024)
- Darker, Lighter, Puffy, Flat (November 2023 – May 2024)
- No Feeling Is Final. The Skopje Solidarity Collection (April 2023 – January 2024)
- Laure Prouvost. Ohmmm age Oma je ohomma mama (May – October 2023)
- Rajkamal Kahlon. Which Side Are You On? (December 2022 – April 2023)
- In the meantime, midday comes around (November 2022 – May 2023)
- Sanja Iveković. Works of Heart (1974–2022) (October 2022 – March 2023)
- Katrina Daschner. BURN & GLOOM! GLOW & MOON! Thousand Years of Troubled Genders (June – October 2022)
- Space for Kids. The Art-Nature Laboratory or The Mushrooming Cabinet of Wonders (June – October 2022)
- Defiant Muses. Delphine Seyrig and the Feminist Video Collectives of 1970s and 1980s France (April – September 2022)
- Handspells. Kunsthalle Wien Prize 2021 (February – May 2022)
- Do Nothing, Feel Everything (November 2021 – April 2022)
- Ana Hoffner ex-Prvulovic* & Belinda Kazeem-Kamiński (October 2021 – March 2022)
- Ines Doujak. Geistervölker (October 2021 – January 2022)
- Ho Rui An. The Ends of a Long Boom (July – October 2021)
- And if I devoted my life to one of its feathers? (May – September 2021)
- Averklub Collective. Manuš Means Human (June – May 2021)
- Space for Kids. Footprints in a Sea of Data (October – June 2021)
- KISS (July 2020 – June 2021)
- Cybernetics of the Poor (December 2020 – April 2021)
- Želimir Žilnik. Shadow Citizens (October 2020 – April 2021)
- Abiona Esther Ojo & Huda Takriti. Weaving Truths, Untangling Fictions (Kunsthalle Wien Prize 2020, December 2020 – March 2021)
- Space for Kids. It´s your Mo(nu)ment! (October – November 2020)
- ... of bread, wine, cars, security and peace (March – October 2020)
- And if I devoted my life to one of its feathers? A Prologue in Public Space (June – July 2020)
- Nine Buildings, Stripped (November 2019 – February 2020)
- Kunsthalle Wien Prize 2019. Nina Vobruba & Malte Zander (November 2019 – January 2020)
- Time Is Thirsty (October 2019 – January 2020)
- Stinking Dawn, by Gelatin and Liam Gillick (July – October 2019)
- Death to Pigs, by Yhdessa Hendeles (February – May 2018)
- Function Follows Vision, Vision Follows Reality (May – August 2015)
- Individual Stories. Collecting as Portrait and Methodology (June – October 2015)
- Ken Lum. Coming Soon (Art in public space, March – October 2015)
- Destination Vienna (April – May 2015)
- Curatorial Ethics (Conference, April 2015)
- Pierre Bismuth. The Curator, the Lawyer and the Psychoanalyst (February – March 2015)
- The Future of Memory. An Exhibition on the Infinity of the Present Time (February – March 2015)
- Tony Conrad. Two Degrees of Separation (December 2012 – March 2015)
- Kidnappers Foil (November 2014 – January 2015)
- Leander Schönweger. The Fog Disperses. Kunsthalle Wien Prize 2014 (October – November 2015)
- Blue Times (October 2014 – January 2015)
- New Ways of Doing Nothing (June – October 2014)
- Pierre Bismuth. The Grass is Always Greener on the Other Side – New Vindobona (Art in public space, February – September 2014)
- The Brancusi Effect (June – September 2014)
- I'm Isa Genzken, The Only Female Fool (May – September 2014)
- Attention Economy (May – June 2014)
- Silke Otto-Knapp/Carl Fredrik Hill. Questions of Travel (Vienna) (March – May 2014)
- Das Wunder des Lebens. Jos de Gruyter & Harald Thys (February – May 2014)
- Salon der Angst (September 2013 – January 2014)
- WWTBD – What Would Thomas Bernhard Do (Festival, May 2013)
- Daniel Knorr. Explosion (Art in public space, March 2012 – May 2013)
- The Art of William S. Burroughs: Cut-ups, Cut-ins, Cut-outs (6 – 10 2012)
- Urs Fischer (February – May 2012)
- Power Up. Female Pop Art (November 2010 – March 2011)
- Street and Studio (June – October 2010)
- Keith Haring 1978 – 1982 (May – September 2010)
- 1989. End of History or Beginning of the Future? (October 2009 – February 2010)
- Thomas Ruff (May – September 2009)
- The Porn Identity (February – June 2009)
- Western Motel. Edward Hopper and Contemporary Art (October 2008 – February 2009)
- Derek Jarman. Brutal Beauty (June – October 2008)
- Matthew Barney: Drawing Restraint (March – June 2008)
- Nathalie Djurberg (January – March 2007)
- Raymond Pettibon (October 2006 – February 2007)
- Summer of Love (May – September 2006)
- Luca Faccio, Image Transfers, Wien/Pyongyang (March–May 2007)
- Steven Cohen (February – March 2006)
- Louise Bourgeois (November 2005 – February 2006)
- Marcel Broodthaers (July – October 2003)
- Anri Sala (March – June 2003)
- Ugo Rondinone (June – September 2003)
- Yayoi Kusama (February – April 2002)
- Tele(Visions) (October 2001 – June 2002)
- Steve McQueen (May – August 2008)
- Shirin Neshat (March – June 2000)
- The Circus as a Parallel Universe (May – September 2012)
- Le Surrealisme, c'est moi – Homage an Salvador Dalí
- Space. About A Dream (April – August 2011)
- Andy Warhol. A Factory (February – May 1999)
- Nan Goldin – I'll Be Your Mirror (January – March 1998)
