= Modepalast =

Fashion event

Modepalast founded in 2003, is a fashion event which takes place once a year, in April at the museumsquartier (MQ), in Vienna, Austria. The event focuses on young fashion design, both local and international labels, and thus creates a platform for over 80 new designers to present their creations. The program features a variety of events, shopping, fashion shows, and designers.

== About ==
Modepalast was founded in 2003 by Cloed Baumgartner and Jasmin Ladenhaufen, who worked as the managers and the curators of the fair. Introducing to the local market the concept of a fixed fashion event, Modepalast became an important part of the Viennese fashion scene. The fair includes a variety of fashion items as well as accessories and hosts designers from Austria, Germany, Switzerland, Czech Republic, Hungary, England, Poland and the Netherlands. They sold the company in 2012.

== Program ==
Modepalast 2009 takes place from 23 to 26 April, at the quartier21 of the Museumsquartier (Museums quarter). The Designers' works range from street fashion, Urban wear to high fashion as well as jewellery and accessories. The designers also present their works in different fashion shows, which take place on a runway in the center of the Museumsquartier. This year's special focus is on young designers from neighboring countries, and from the Netherlands, which will present in

== Side events ==
Alongside the main event in the Museumsquartier different parties and fashion events throughout Vienna will take place.

== See also ==
- Museumsquartier
