= MuseumsQuartier =

Cultural area in Vienna, Austria

Coordinates: 48°12′12″N 16°21′32″E

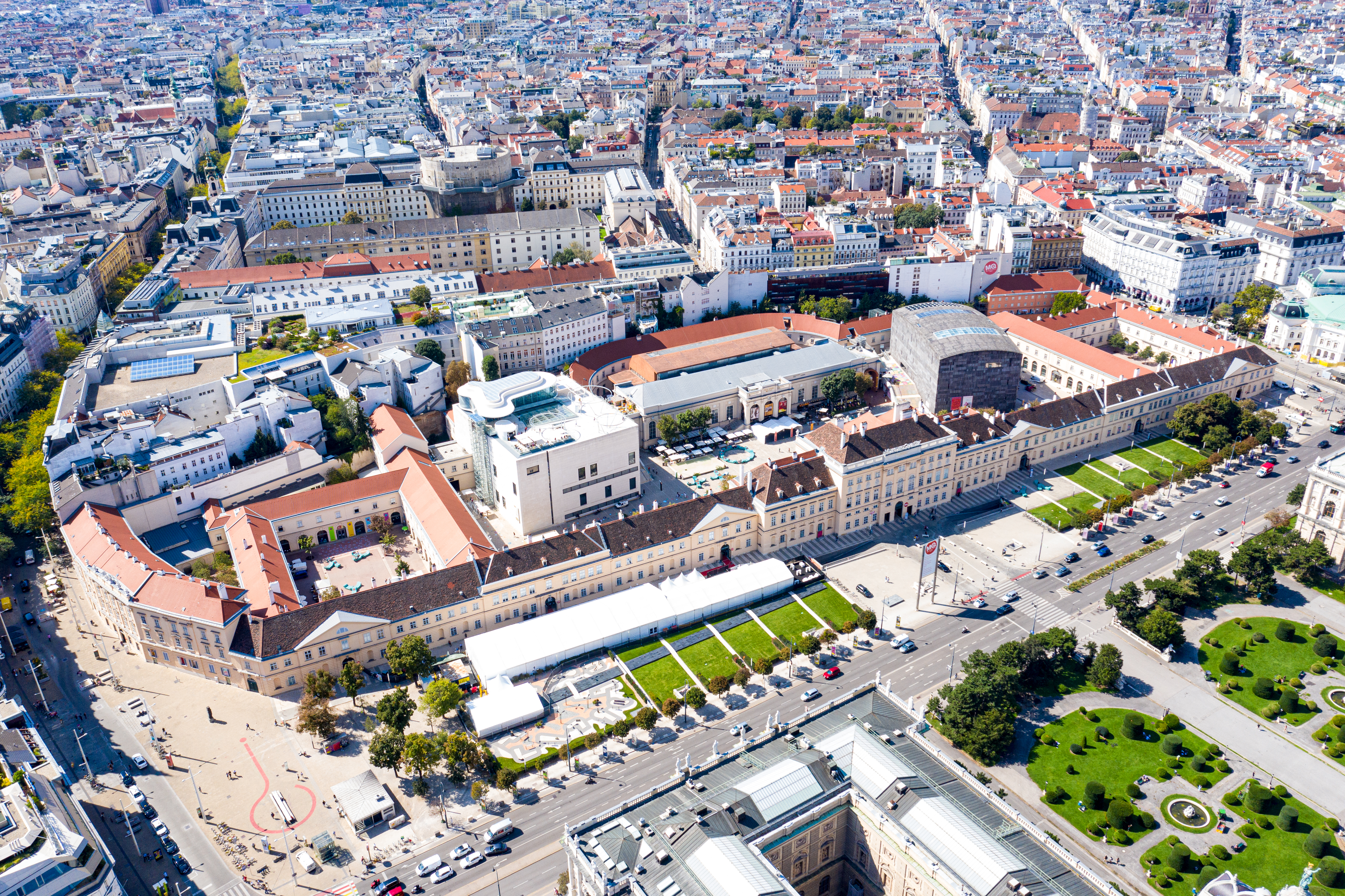
Museumsquartier panorama

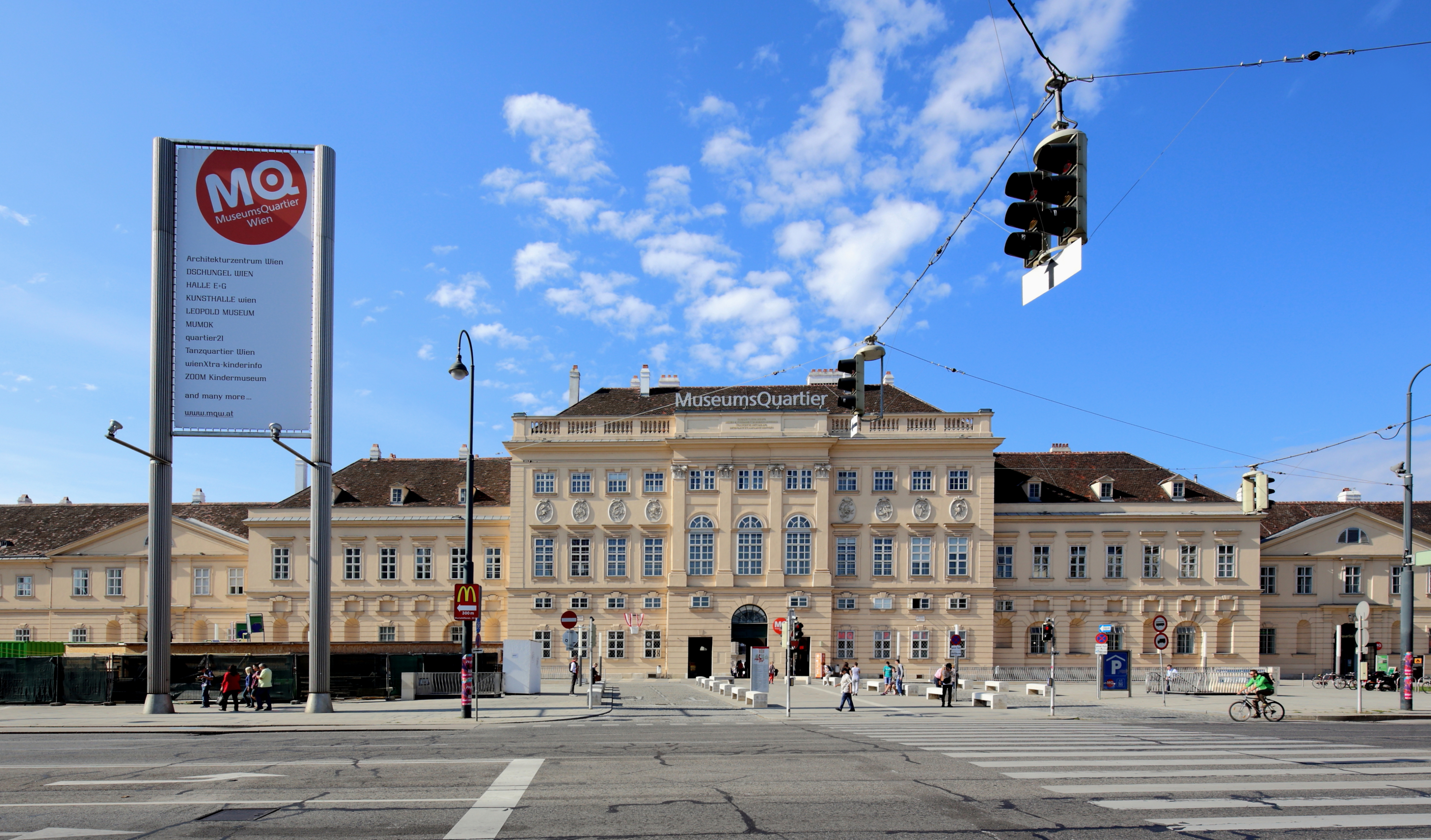
Front view of the Museumsquartier

The Museumsquartier (MQ) is an area of 9 ha (22 acres) in the 7th district of the city of Vienna, Austria.

== Highlights ==
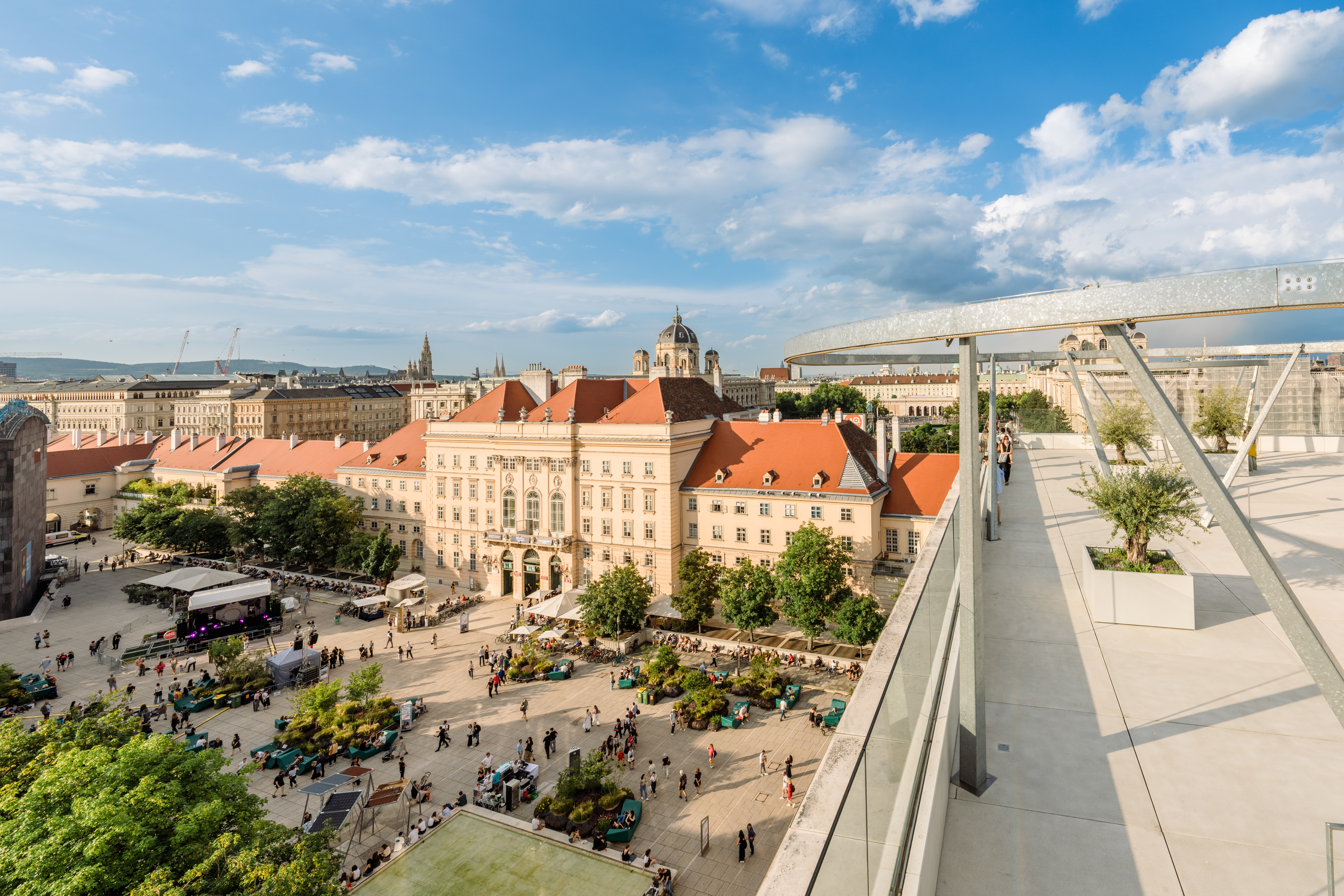
Inner courtyard of the Museumsquartier

The MuseumsQuartier contains Baroque buildings as well as Modern architecture by the architects Laurids and Manfred Ortner (Ortner & Ortner Baukunst). The renovation of the former court stables began in April 1998. Three years later, the MuseumsQuartier opened in two stages (June and September 2001). The total cost of the construction was 150 million euro (two billion Austria schilling).

The MQ is home to a range of installations from large art museums like the Leopold Museum and the MUMOK (Museum of Modern Art Ludwig Foundation Vienna) to contemporary exhibition spaces like the Kunsthalle Wien and festivals like the Wiener Festwochen, an annual summer event that is headquartered in the MuseumsQuartier Wien.

Additional highlights include the Tanzquartier, an international, state-of-the-art centre for dance, the Architekturzentrum Wien, production studios for new media, artist studios for artists-in-residence, art and cultural facilities designed for children, and a variety of other events and festivals such as the Viennale film festival, the ImPulsTanz Vienna International Dance Festival, Coded Cultures, Techno Sensual, and many others.

The MuseumsQuartier hosts quartier21, which features around 60 alternative art groups, for example eSeL.

Since 2002, an artist-in-residence programme has brought over 735 artists to MuseumsQuartier, who have been working and living in the studio spaces. The residency programme is run together with tranzit.org / ERSTE Stiftung, the Federal Ministry for Europe, Integration and Foreign Affairs and the Research Institute for Arts and Technology.

The Museumsquartier station of line U2 of the Vienna U-Bahn, as well as the metro station "Volkstheater" is located next to the premises.

== Controversy ==
There was negative media reaction after it became known that the expensive public buildings had serious shortcomings regarding barrier-free wheelchair accessibility. Not even the recently constructed buildings (Kunsthalle, MUMOK and Leopold Museum) were able to fulfill the most basic requirements. After many negative reports across the media, and the commitment of handicapped interest groups, the majority of the problems were repaired in the following years.

Public Netbase, an internet provider and sponsor of electronic art and culture programs, was not invited to be part of Museumsquartier in 2002. Originally located in a part of the MQ, it had to leave during the renovations, but after the construction was completed, it was not able to return to its former premises.

== Institutions ==

- MUMOK
- Leopold Museum
- Kunsthalle Wien
- ZOOM Kindermuseum
- Tanzquartier
- Architekturzentrum Wien
- Q21
- monochrom
- Modepalast

== Gallery ==
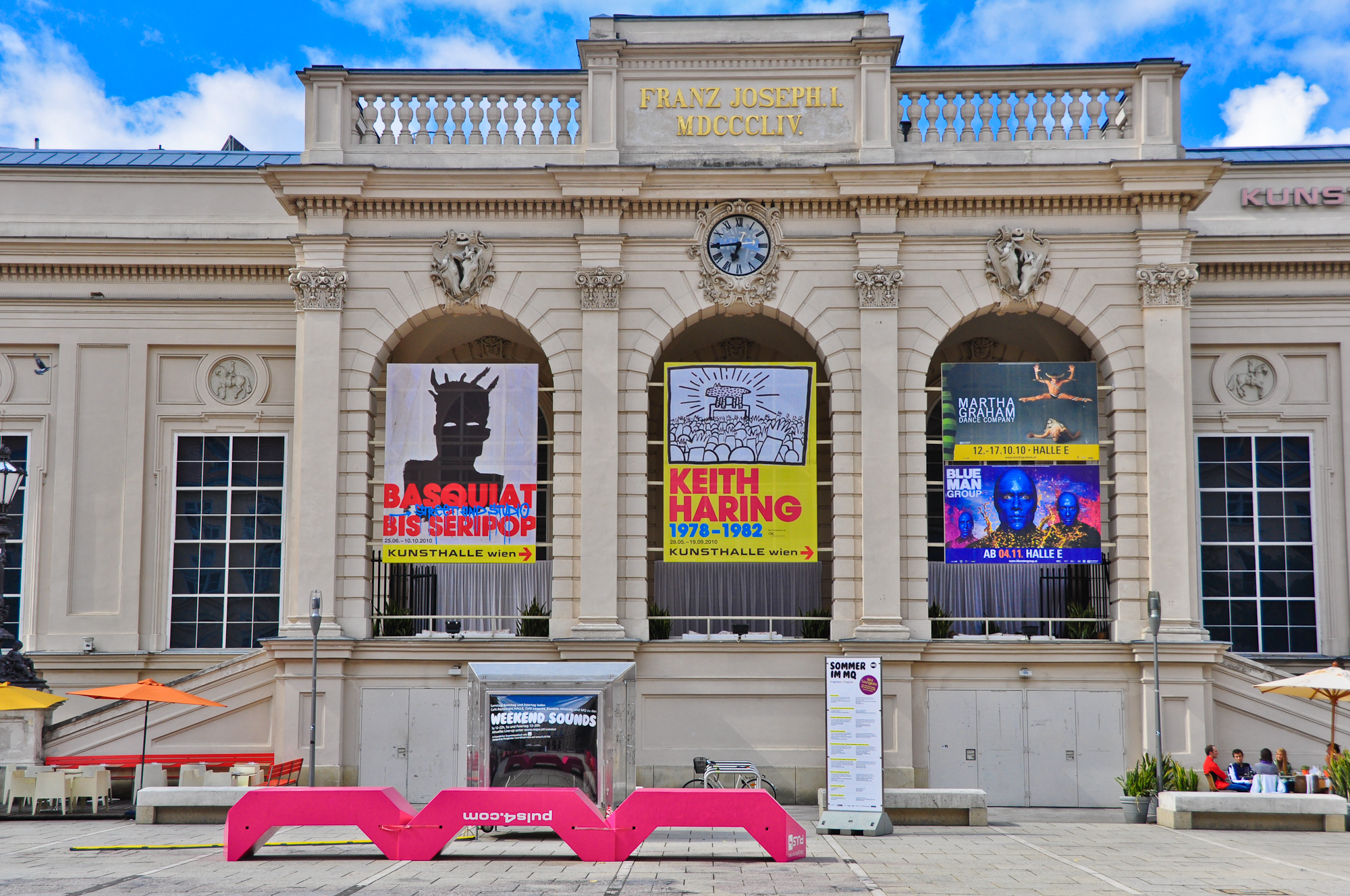
Kunsthalle Wien

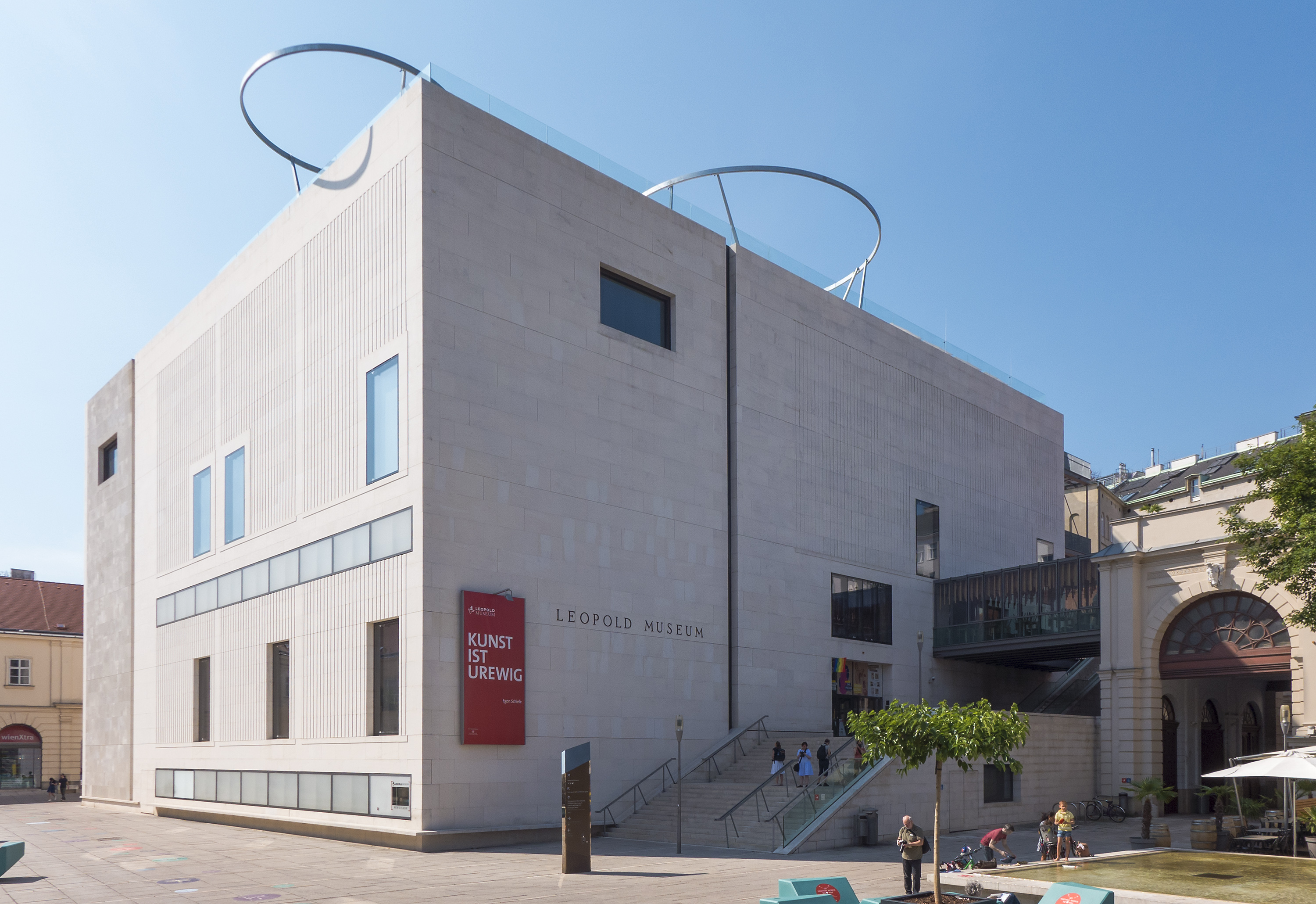
Leopold Museum

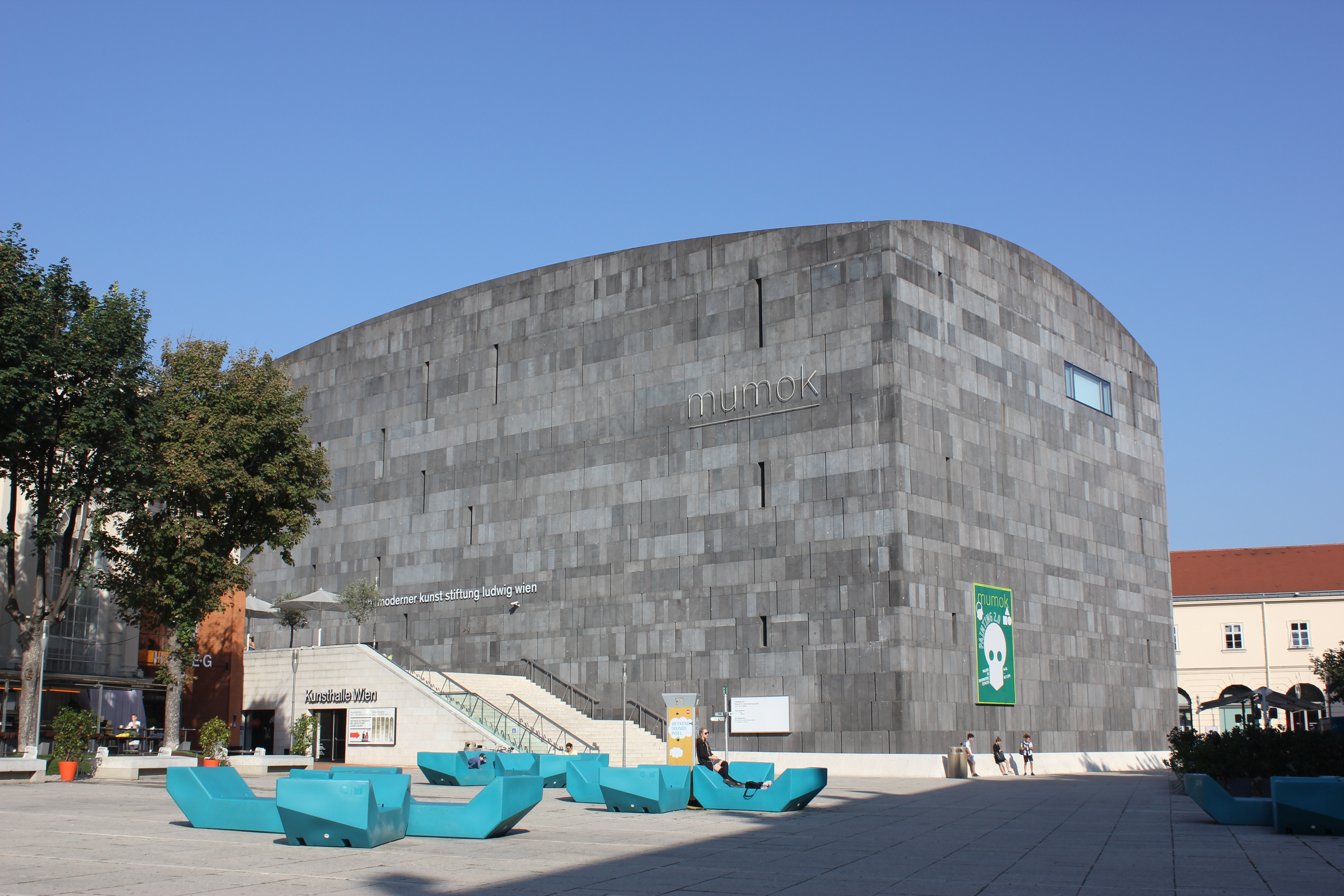
Mumok

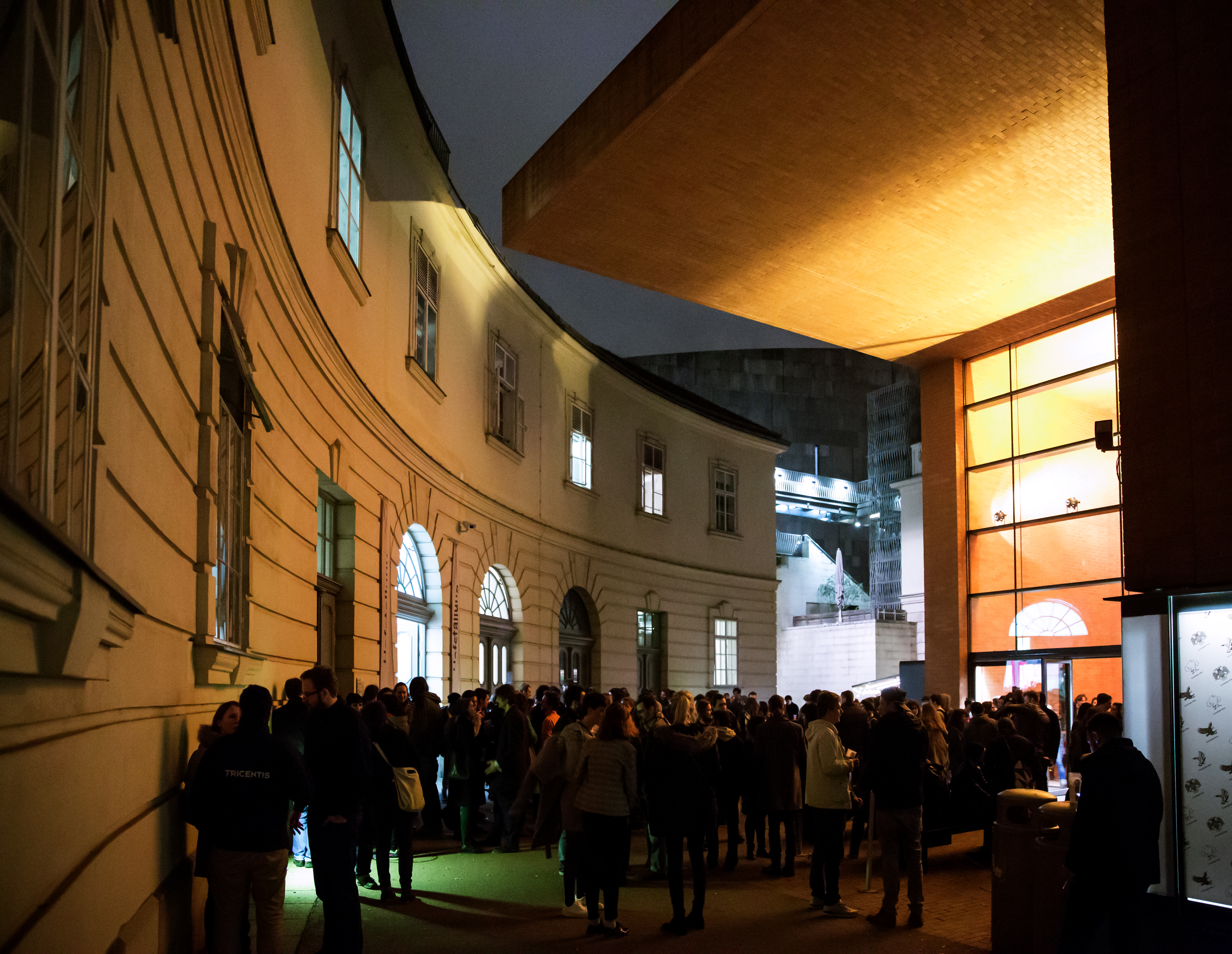
Nightlife in MuseumsQuartier

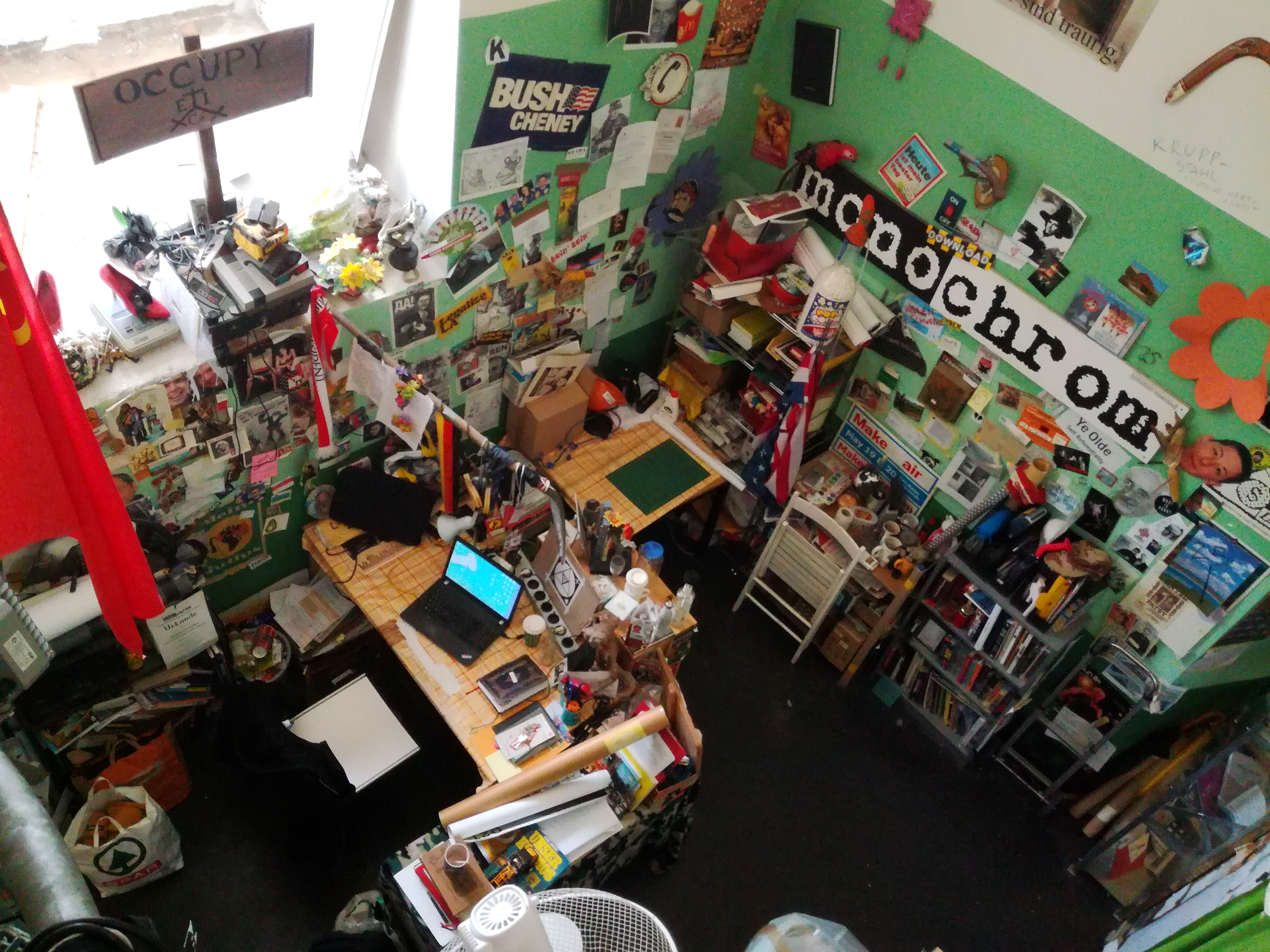
Art-theory group monochrom's office and workspace at Museumsquartier's Quartier21.

== Bibliography ==
- Van Uffelen, Chris. Contemporary Museums - Architecture, History, Collections, Braun Publishing, 2010, ISBN 978-3-03768-067-4, pages 162-163.
