= Teikō Shiotani =

Japanese photographer (1899–1988)

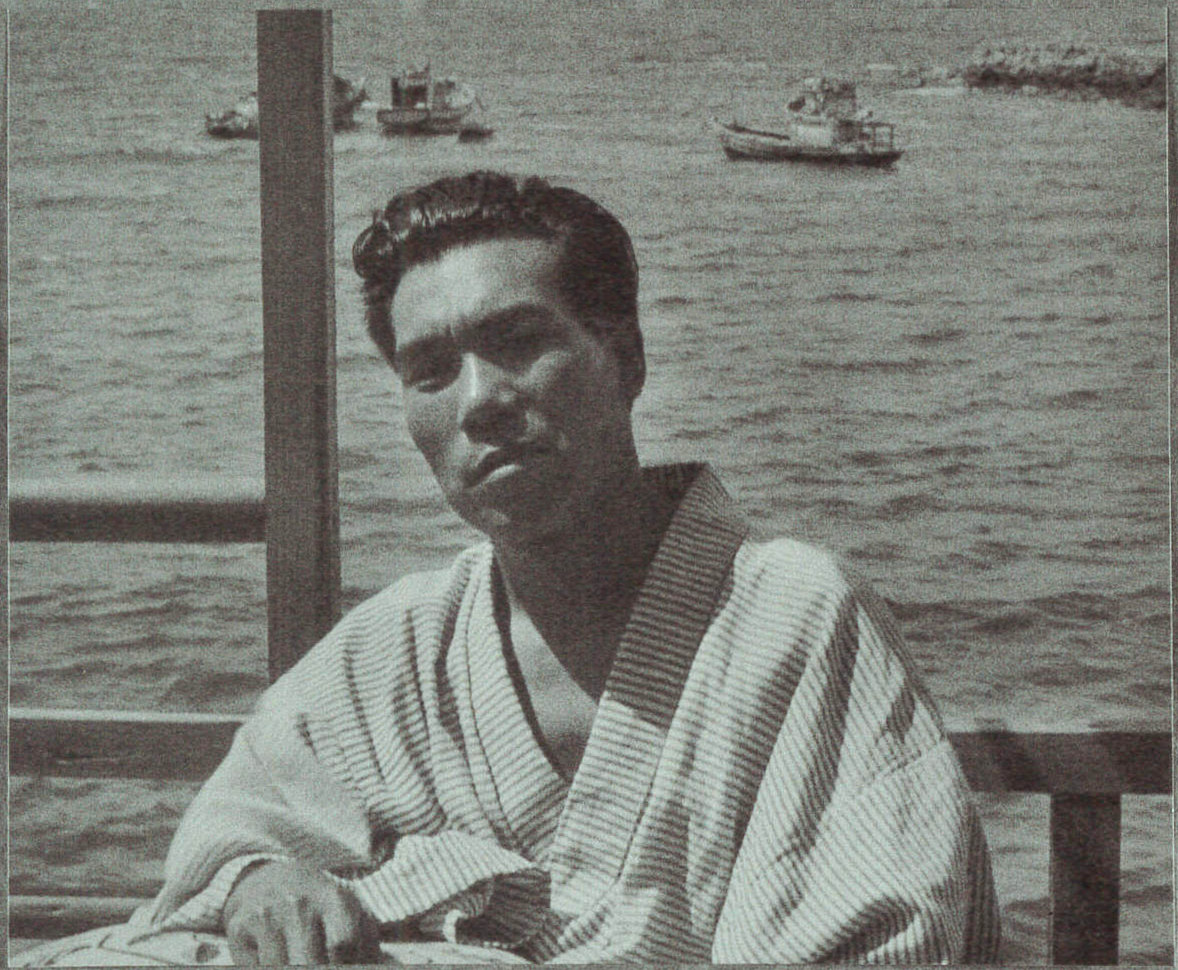
Teikō Shiotani, 35 years old

Teikō Shiotani (塩谷 定好, Shiotani Teikō; 24 October 1899 – 28 October 1988) (Note: According to Hepburn romanization, Shiotani's adopted given name is written "Teikō". Many publications in English do not provide macrons, resulting in "Teiko". Following an informal convention, some other publications give it as "Teikoh".) was a Japanese photographer whose work in the late 1920s and early 1930s in and near Tottori, where he lived, made him a major figure in Japanese pictorialism.

Despite living far from any metropolis, Shiotani was famous among photographers nationwide. He portrayed landscapes, seascapes, priests at a local temple, his family, and other quotidian matters and scenes; his images at times unmediated, at others exploiting lens aberration or using darkroom effects. Among the photographers directly influenced by him was Shōji Ueda, who lived nearby.

As ideals and fashions in photography changed, Shiotani's work was largely forgotten in postwar Japan until interest was reawakened by a 1975 book devoted to his work; he later became known outside Japan thanks to an exhibition of Japanese photography that toured Europe from 1979 to 1982. Many prints made by Shiotani survive in museum collections, and since 2016 four photobooks largely or exclusively dedicated to his work have been published in Japan.

== Life and career ==
=== Early life ===
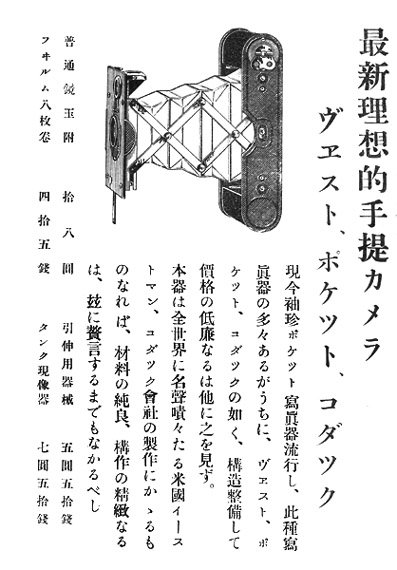
Magazine advertisement (January 1913) for the Vest Pocket Kodak, describing it as "the latest ideal handheld camera"

Sadayoshi Shiotani (鹽谷 定好, (Note: 鹽 is the kyūjitai (a traditional but now obsolete form) of shio; the shinjitai (new and currently used form) is 塩. Although most modern publications silently modernize, the book The Legend in Art Photography leaves intact the orthography of the prewar text that it reprints; and its collection (pp. 204–229) of prewar magazine articles by Shiotani shows consistent use of 鹽 (not 塩).) Shiotani Sadayoshi) was born on 24 October 1899 in Akasaki (since 2004 part of Kotoura), Tottori, to a family who owned a shipping agency. He was the eldest son; his paternal grandfather had held various important civic posts and been interested in photography.

As a young boy, Shiotani enjoyed drawing and was good at it. When he was 12 or 13, he received a Vest Pocket Kodak (Note: Description of the original model of the Vest Pocket Kodak: G. E. White, "History and development of the VPK ", The Vest Pocket Kodak.) camera. Equipped with a simple meniscus lens, this folding camera used 127 film, a small format for the time, and was marketed as sufficiently compact to fit in a vest pocket and was popular in Japan. When Shiotani was 13, he participated in a photography event at Karo (賀露) harbour in Tottori.

From 1912, Shiotani attended Kurayoshi Agricultural High School (now Tottori Prefectural College of Agriculture). Powerfully built, he did well at judo. He graduated in 1917, whereupon he became serious about photography. Like other users of the Vest Pocket Kodak, the teenage Shiotani was embarrassed when serious amateur photographers saw him using it; he soon supplemented it with a large format (90×130 mm) camera with a Carl Zeiss Tessar lens, although he continued to use the Vest Pocket Kodak (or at least its lens) for the rest of his life.

Shiotani's fellow photographers formed the Kōei Club in 1919, with over two hundred members. (Kōei, 光影, means "light and shade".) Shiotani's first known attendance in a Kōei meeting was in 1921, and photographs of his appeared in its magazine Kōei from 1922. (Note: Though provincial (and only lasting from 1920 to 1925), Kōei was "an extremely high-quality journal, with . . . photographs reproduced using the collotype process". Noriko Tsutatani, "To things beloved – Shiotani Teikō 1899–1988" (in English, p. 277, n. 5); "Itoshiki mono e: Shiotani Teikō: 1899–1988" (in Japanese, 愛しきものへ 塩谷定好1899–1988, p. 207, n. 5); within Itoshiki mono e. Some issues of the magazine also showed a Roman-letter title: Kwoyei (using a romanization system that even then was archaic). Photographs by Shiotani (using the name Gyokkō Shiotani, 鹽谷玉光) published in Kōei are reproduced in Itoshiki mono e, pp. 212–213; his pair of articles (1922, 1923) about pinhole photography is reproduced in The Legend in Art Photography, pp. 204–205.) Hokutō Saigō (西郷北濤), the key figure in Kōei, greatly encouraged Shiotani.

Shiotani became an enthusiastic user of the Vest Pocket Kodak, and in 1919 set up the "Vest Club" (i.e. Vest Pocket Kodak club; ベスト倶楽部, Besuto Kurabu) in Akasaki, with 88 members. Perhaps thanks to his grandfather, he was freed from a career in the family shipping business and instead allowed to pursue photography.

Many Japanese amateur photographers of the time prized a painterly effect over detail – not necessarily Western-style painting, but often Japanese, and particularly of a hazy kind. The aim was geijutsu shashin, which, depending on context, could be translated as "artistic", "art", "salon" or "pictorialist" photography. The meniscus lens of the Vest Pocket Kodak did not permit detail, and photographers using it – notably Masataka Takayama, Jun Watanabe, Makihiko Yamamoto, Mitsugi Arima (有馬光城) and Kōyō Yasumoto (安本江陽) – would often remove an aperture limiter from around its lens (fūdo hazushi), thereby not only increasing the aperture by about two stops but also greatly softening the focus. Shiotani was attracted by the misty results and their resemblance to the works of a painter from Tottori whom he respected highly, Kanji Maeta.

In 1922, Shiotani married Sadako Inoue (井上貞子, 1905–1988). They had three sons, Sōnosuke (宗之助, b. June 1923), Reiji (玲二, November 1926 – March 1927) and Makoto (誠, August 1940 – September 1945); and two daughters, Yūko (優子, b. February 1930) and Yōko (陽子, b. July 1934).

=== Prominence ===
Shiotani's earliest known appearance in a major magazine was his Still life (Seibutsu), among contest winners in the January 1925 issue of Geijutsu Shashin Kenkyū. His Shadow (Kage) appeared in the March 1925 issue of Camera. As an editor responsible for selecting work for both magazines (and editor in chief of Geijutsu Shashin Kenkyū), Kenkichi Nakajima realized that Shiotani was unusually talented.

In August 1925, Shiotani and four other photographers made a trip around the coasts of Shimane Prefecture: Kaka (加賀), Konami (小波), Shichirui, Mihonoseki, and particularly Okidomari. Much later, Shiotani told Shōji Ueda:

We took photographs for three days and I thought we would die. ... During that trip we didn't encounter a single woman. There were no inns; we just wrapped ourselves in straw mats and kept on walking. Finally we managed to get some curry and rice with duck eggs and it was delicious. (Note: Originally: 「三日間、死ぬ思いして撮ったんじゃよ。（中略）まるで女に会わん旅じゃった。宿屋もなく、ゴザをまとい、ただただ歩いた。やっと、ありついたアヒルの卵入りのライスカレーがうまかったなあ」. Quoted in Takayuki Kobayashi (小林孝之), "Honshi sōkan 50-shūnen kinen tokushū: Besutan no aji o ikiru: Dai-ikkai getsurei shashin nyūsen Shiotani Teikō shi no baai" (本誌創刊50周年記念特集 ベス単の味を生きる 第一回月例写真入選塩谷定好氏の場合; This magazine's 50th anniversary special: Living for the feel of the Vest Pocket Kodak: The case of Teikō Shiotani, winner of the first monthly exhibition), Asahi Camera, April 1976, pp. 161–164.)

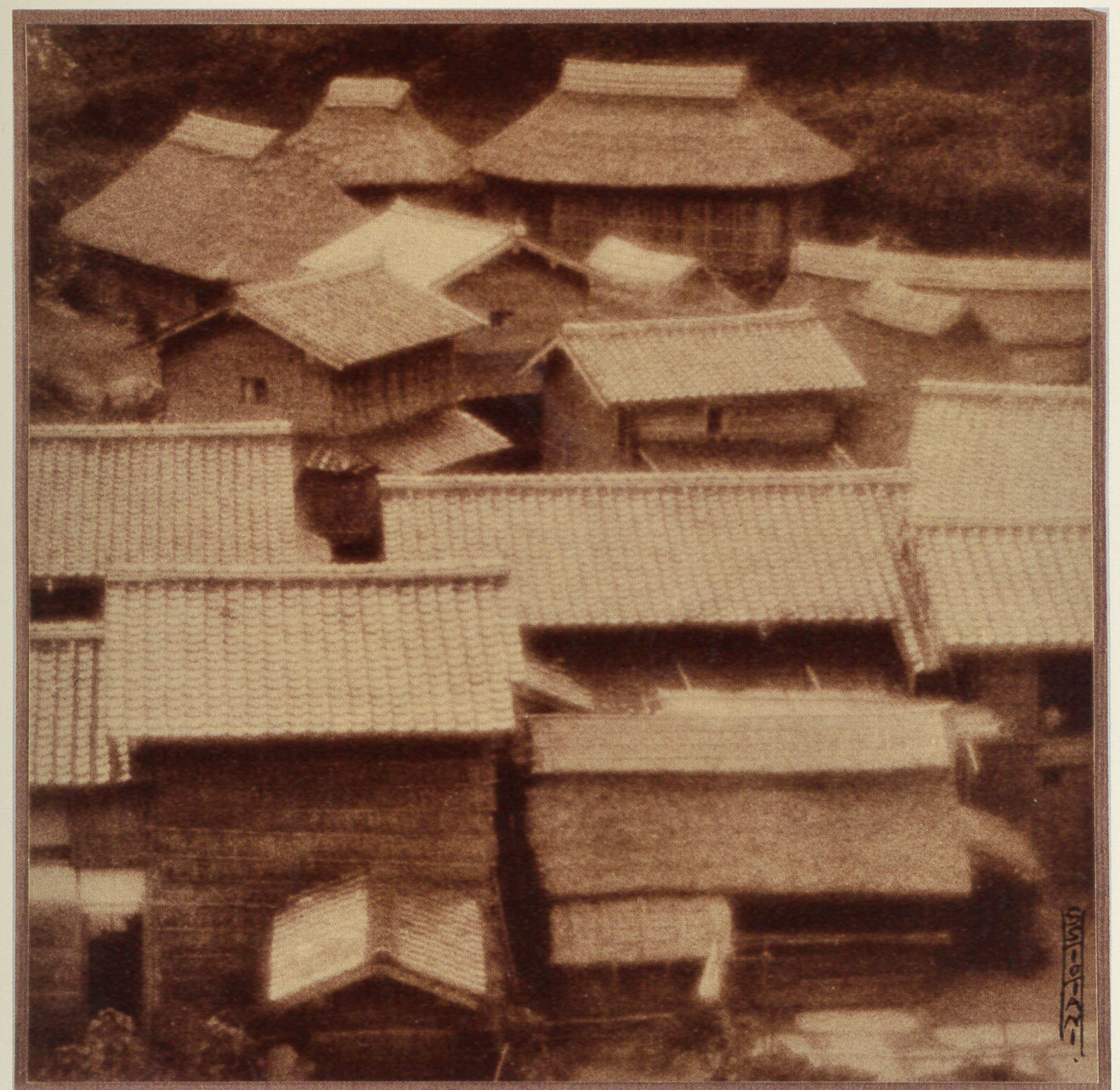
Bird's-Eye View of a Village, published in 1926

Despite these hardships, a number of photographs Shiotani took on the trip soon appeared in magazines. His Bird's-Eye View of a Village (Mura no chōkan) was published in the March 1926 issue of Geijutsu Shashin Kenkyū. (Note: A print from a similar but different negative was published elsewhere in 1926, and others with a wider view in 1927 and (from a photograph taken in 1925) in 1934; all carry the same title. See the plates and their captions on pp. 25–29 within Itoshiki mono e.) It was influenced by Picasso and Braque's paintings from L'Estaque (which Shiotani knew of via the writings of Nakajima), and also Maeta's paintings of Paris. In 1926, he won the first prize in the first contest ever run by Asahi Camera, with Fishing Village (Gyoson), a photograph of Takohana. (Note: Takohana (or Takobana, either of which is spelt in Japanese 多古鼻) – literally "Tako nose", and thus Cape Takohana – is in Shimane-chō, Matsue.)

From 1925 to 1927, Shiotani was also one of the key members of a group of photographers that in 1928 formally became the Japan Photography Association (Nihon Kōga Kyōkai, 日本光画協会). A successor to the Japan Photographic Art Association (Nihon Kōga Geijutsu Kyōkai, 日本光画芸術協会), this published a magazine (Gashū, 画集) and an annual, and held meetings and exhibitions. It was open to expressive distortions made with the camera, in the darkroom, or to the print: in addition to removing the aperture limiter from around the lens of a Vest Pocket Kodak, this might include deforming the printing paper under the enlarger, wiping prints with darker oil, and selectively removing this or adding powder to lighten areas. (Note: The three processes were named deforumashion (デフォルマシオン), aburae-gu egaki-okoshi-hō (油絵具描き起こし法), and zōkin-gake (雑巾がけ) respectively.) The work of Shiotani and the three other key members – Yamamoto, Takayama and Watanabe – was highly regarded by Nakajima, whose publications made their work well known (and who in 1933 published a how-to guide for the Vest Pocket Kodak (Note: Vesutan no tsukaikata (ヴェス単の使ひ方; How to use the Vest Pocket Kodak; OCLC 673309139); five years later, Vesutan Pāretto no tsukaikata (ヴェス単パーレットの使ひ方; How to use the vest-pocket Pearlette; OCLC 672633250). (The Pearlette was a near-copy by Konishiroku of Contessa-Nettel's Piccolette, itself derived from the Vest Pocket Kodak.))).

From the mid-1920s, and often under one pseudonym or another, (Note: Shiotani's pseudonyms: Sadako Shiotani (塩谷貞子, his wife's name), Sōnosuke Shiotani (塩谷宗之助, his first son's name), Gyokkō Shiotani (塩谷玉光), Yukiko Inoue (井上幸子), Kaoru Ōyama (大山香), Sadayoshi Shioi (塩井定好). (When printed until the late 1940s, 塩 would normally have appeared as 鹽.) By contrast, Teikō (the name by which he came to be known as a photographer) was not a pseudonym but instead a yūsoku-yomi (reading used for professional purposes) of his actual name 定好 (first intended to be read as "Sadayoshi"). Most references to Shiotani in Japanese do not specify the pronunciation of 定好; where specified, it is usually "Teikō" but occasionally "Sadayoshi". Some early prints are marked "S.SIOTANI" or "SSIOTANI"; the example here of the latter is from the 1925/1926 print, also shown in this article, of Bird's-Eye View of a Village. ("Siotani" is the equivalent in Kunrei or Nihon romanization to "Shiotani" in Hepburn romanization.) By contrast, many postwar prints are signed with the single character 塩 (i.e. "Shio"); these include plates 78, 79, 81, 82, 84 in The Age of Art Photography. The form "Sadayoshi Shiotani" was used in (i) the travelling exhibition Fotografia Giapponese dal 1848 ad Oggi (as evidenced in both the Italian- and the English-language book that accompanied it), (ii) the Photokina exhibition Fotografie 1922–1982 (as evidenced in both its bilingual catalogue and a review: Renee Bruns, "The picture shows", Popular Photography, January 1983, p. 181), and (iii) the March 1988 Photo Metro.) Shiotani's photographs frequently appeared in four Japanese photography magazines: Asahi Camera, Geijutsu Shashin Kenkyū, Camera and The Photo-Times. (Note: For a description of each of the magazines, see Mari Shirayama, "Major photography magazines': pp. 378–385 within The History of Japanese Photography.) All four were new, championing the new trends in art photography whose major proponents were Tetsusuke Akiyama (秋山轍輔) of the Tokyo Photographic Research Society and Kōrō Kometani (米谷紅浪) of the Naniwa Photo Club, both with "a style reminiscent of academic painting"; Shinzō Fukuhara of the Japan Photographic Society, with "light and its harmony" (influenced by Impressionism); and Hakuyō Fuchikami of the Japan Photographic Art Association), with avant-garde techniques drawn from painting – four photographers who were also among the judges of the magazines' contests. Shiotani became a leading figure in photography in the San'in region, and known nationwide: although Tottori had the lowest population of any of Japan's 47 prefectures, (Note: According to the 1925 census, Tottori had a population of 472 thousand (and was the sole prefecture with under half a million people). The populations of Tokyo, Osaka, Hyōgo and Kyoto prefectures were, respectively, 4.49M, 3.06M, 2.45M and 1.40M. (Aichi, Fukuoka and Hokkaidō each had a population of over two million.) "Jinkō fuken" (人口 府県) = "Population par départements" (in Japanese and French); available via "Kokusei chōsa / Taishō 14-nen kokusei chōsa / zenkoku kekka hyō" (国勢調査 / 大正14年国勢調査 / 全国結果表; National census: Taishō 14 National census: National results tables) at e_Stat, 政府統計の総合窓口 = Portal Site of Official Statistics of Japan, National Statistics Center, Government of Japan.) it was influential; in 1927 it had the fifth largest number of members of photography organizations, behind only Tokyo, Osaka, Hyōgo (including Kobe) and Kyoto.

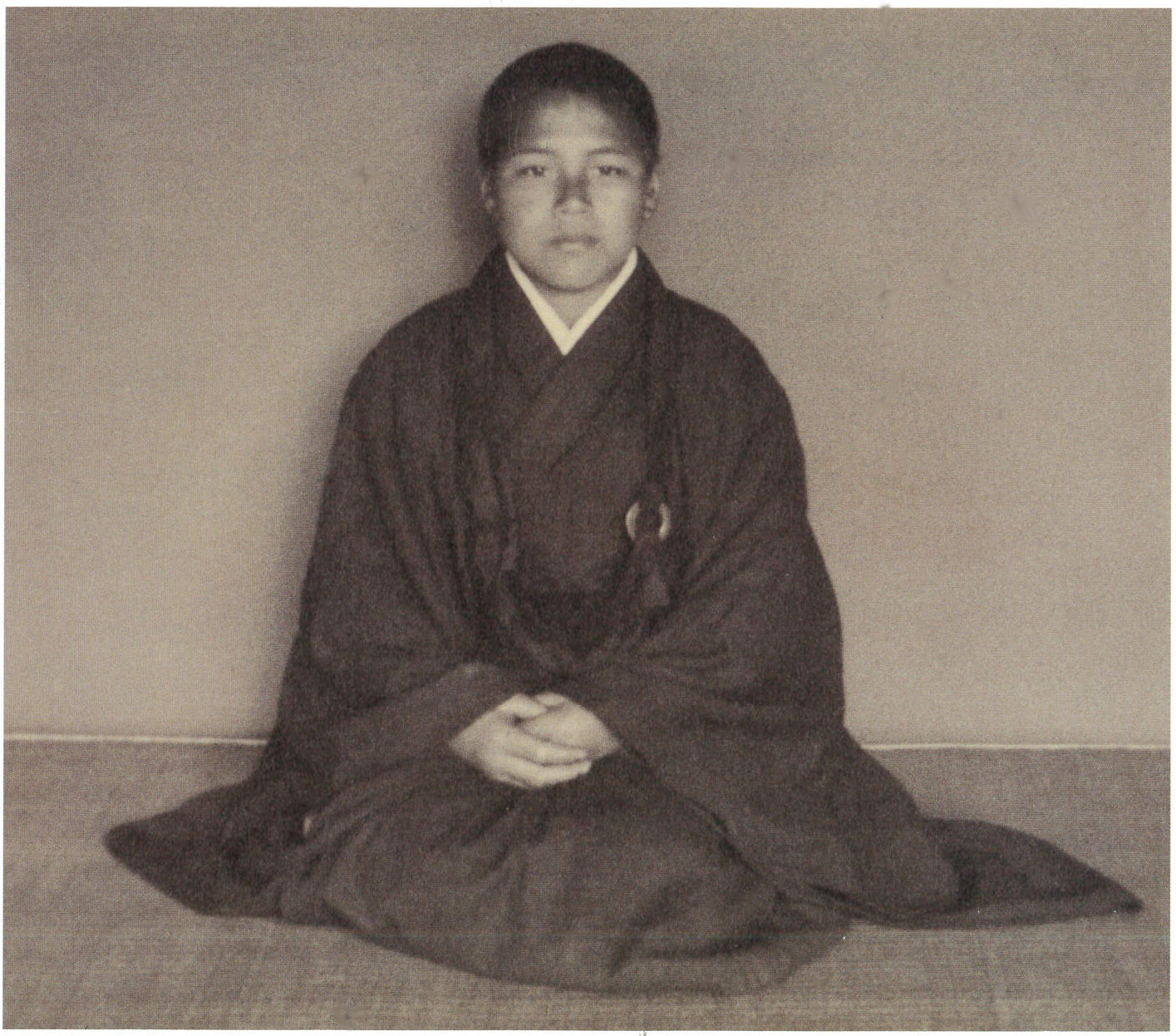
Boy Priest Sitting

Tomoko Takeuji identifies the 1929 photograph Boy Priest Sitting (Note: Kobōzu zazō (小坊主座像). In later books an English title has been variously given as Boy Priest Sitting (The Age of Art Photography, plate 30, p. 56), Portrait of Seated Child Priest (Yume no kageri, plate 59, p. 94); and Portrait of Child Priest Seated (The Legend in Art Photography, plate s54, p. 44).) as the point at which Shiotani matured as a photographer. This was published as a contest winner in the September 1929 issue of Geijutsu Shashin Kenkyū, where Kenkichi Nakajima praised it for its lack of gimmickry and for its calm. (Note: The comments are reproduced on p. 73 of Itoshiki mono e, although next to a subtly different photograph from 1930.) Both Kometani and the younger photographer Eiichi Sakurai also praised it. The photograph shows the then 15-year-old priest Kōsen Daigaku, (Note: 大覺弘宣, Daigaku Kōsen, 1913–2000. As printed, Tsutatani's essay names him as "YASUYOSHI Hisao (later Daigaku, 1913–2000)" (in the Japanese-language original, as 安好久雄（やすよし・ひさお、1913–2000、後に大覚）); however, an errata slip for the book corrects this.) who had been at the Sōtō temple Kaizō-ji (海蔵寺), near Shiotani's house, for less than a year; he was very lonely there but his dignity led Shiotani to make many portraits of him. Shiotani also photographed the other child priests and the chief priest at the temple, of which Shiotani was the chief parishioner.

Shiotani attributed his new appreciation of religious motifs to the death in infancy of his second son, Reiji. As well as photographing people at the temple, he took many photographs of his first son, Sōnosuke, and his daughter, Yūko. As he emerged from mourning, Shiotani enjoyed and depicted their vitality and naïve innocence.

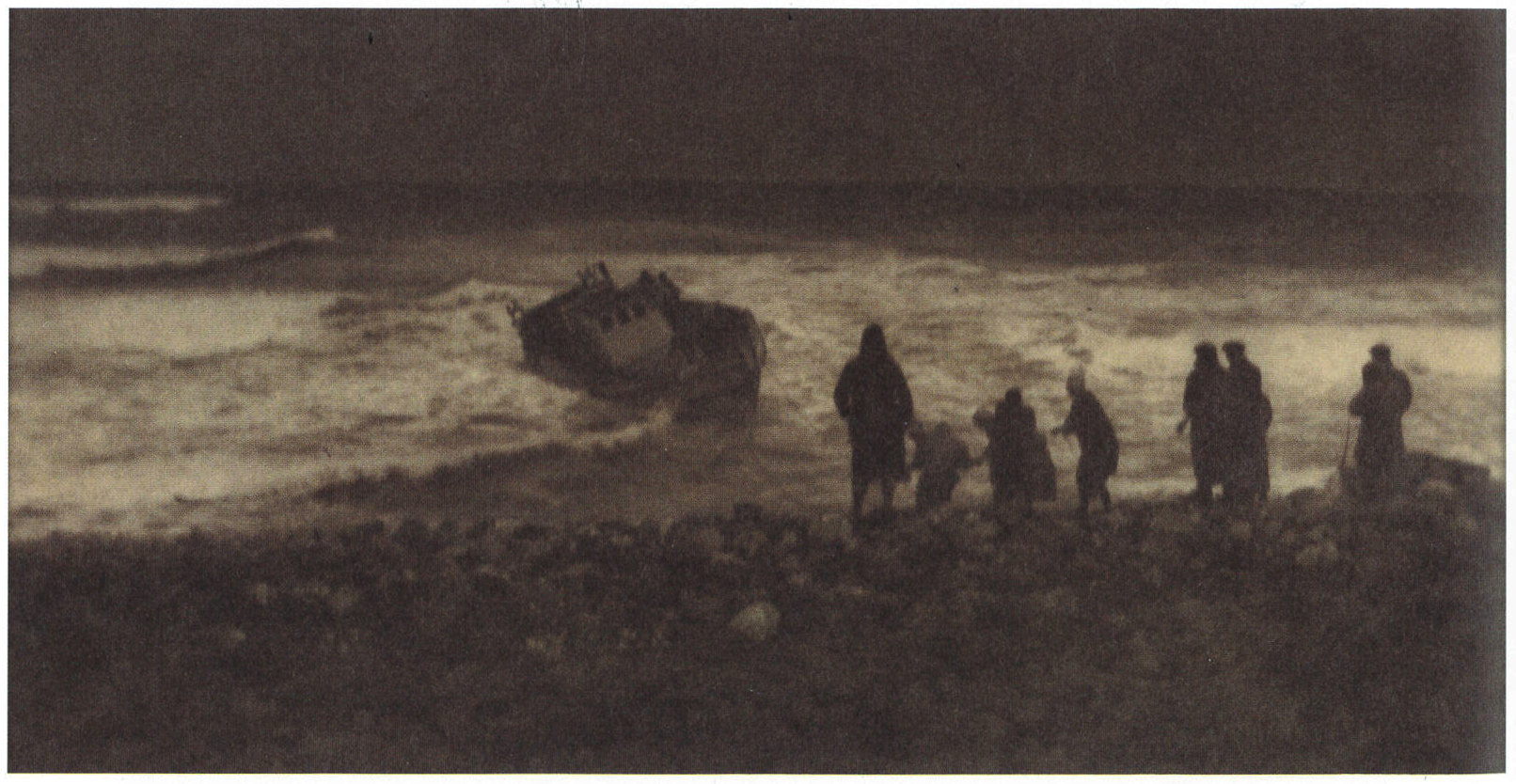
Shipwreck

Shiotani lived his whole life in the family house in Akasaki, which is on the sea; the upstairs room provided an excellent view of the sea, and Shiotani took many photographs of it from his window. He was fascinated by the sea's changeability, and his subject matter expanded from everyday life to the power of nature. Takeuji and Noriko Tsutatani both single out Shipwreck (Hasen, 1929) (Note: Prints exist from more than one negative. One version can be seen here (part of Taisuke Shimanuke (島貫泰介), "80-nen no toki o hete kōkai sareru shashin reimeiki no hīrō Shiotani Teikō no zenbō" (80年の時を経て公開される写真黎明期のヒーロー塩谷定好の全貌; The full picture that took 80 years to be made public of Teikō Shiotani, hero of the early days of photography, Cinra, 29 March 2017); another here (part of フジフイルム・フォトコレクション展 日本の写真史を飾った写真家の「私の1枚」The Fuji Film collection 'My best shot' – 101 photographs of Japan's greatest photographers, Contact, 2017. Takeuji is referring to the latter (plate 24 within The Age of Art Photography, p. 50).) as a powerful seascape. Takeuji points out that it is very different from the "nostalgic landscape photography" popular at the time, but that its depiction of the wrecked ship and its horrified spectators also avoids expressing emotion and instead shows natural forces at work.

Shiotani calculated that his photography from 1915 to 1935 had added up in the following way: devoted to still lifes, 25%; to human figures, 28%; to scenery, 36%; to animals, 11%. (Note: This is typical of Japanese art photography of the time, as described by Ryūichi Kaneko, "The origins and development of Japanese art photography", chapter (pp. 100–141) within The History of Japanese Photography.) On various occasions he wrote of both the importance to him of nature photography, and the childishness of evaluating the landscapes that one sees. Also, that merely showing the exterior of "a piece of grass or a tree" was insufficient, and that the photographer "should attempt to capture the inner life hidden in its nature and to express it".

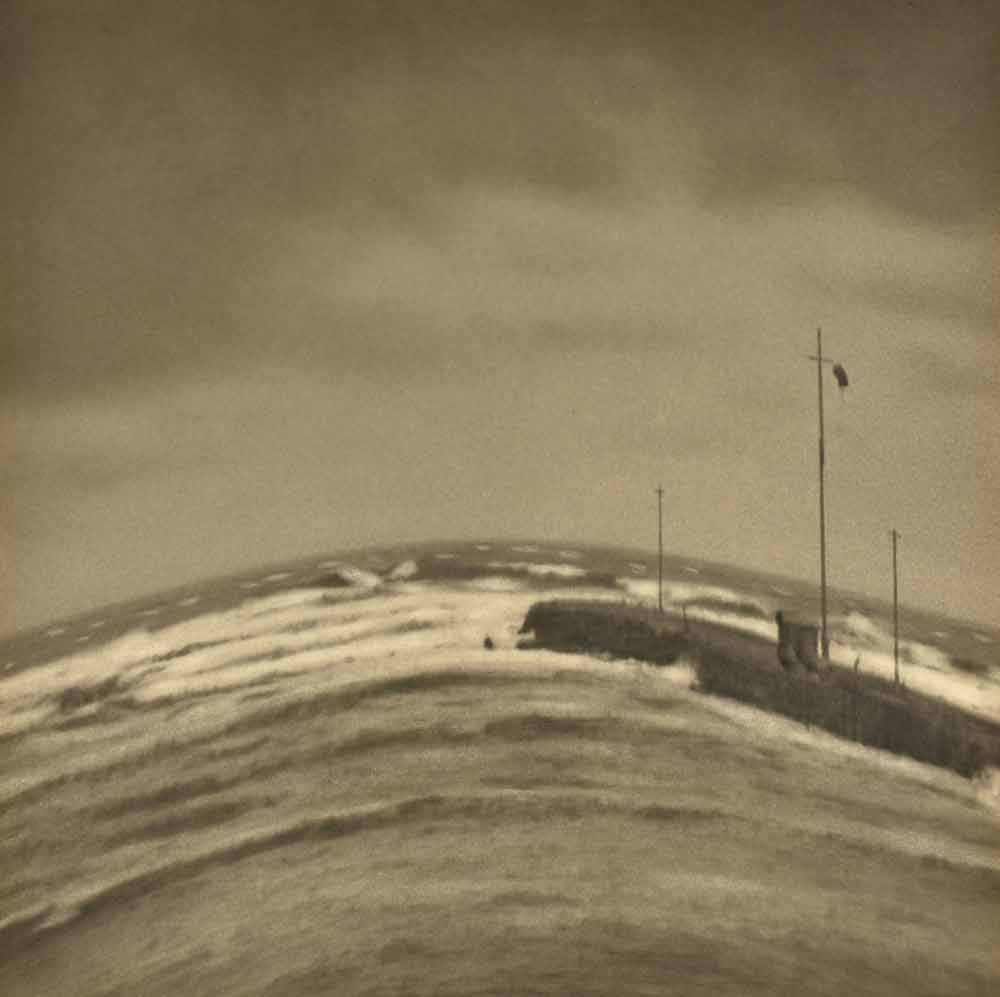
View with Weather Forecast

One of Shiotani's better-known photographs is View with Weather Forecast (Note: The title has been translated as Landscape with Forecasted Weather (Yume no kageri, plate 97, p. 140; and Itoshiki mono e, plate 242, p. 158) and Landscape with Weather Report (The History of Japanese Photography, plate 92, p. 136; The Age of Art Photography, plate 45, p. 71; and The Legend in Art Photography, plate s81, p. 74).) (Tenki yohō no aru fūkei, 天気予報のある風景) of 1931. According to Shiotani's own account, he took the original photograph from his window, using his Vest Pocket Kodak. He trimmed it, and held the photographic paper curved during exposure under the enlarger, "rendering the feeling of that day of hard winds and stressing my first impression by [adjusting] the deformation of the curve". This exaggerated the convexity of the horizon, but Shiotani's manipulations continued: he bleached part of the sky area to emphasize the clouds, applied soot and oils to darken areas, and used an ink eraser to emphasize the white of the waves. The photograph was submitted for a contest in the January 1932 issue of The Photo-Times; it won first prize, but only after the magazine's critic, Sakae Tamura, had said that it was unsatisfactory as submitted and had had its left and right edges trimmed. (Note: The photograph, titled 天氣豫報のある風景 in the orthography of the time, appears on p. 27 within "Katei shashin no kushi" (家庭寫眞の苦心), by 秋生 (read as Shūsei or Akio), on pp. 26–31 of The Photo-Times, January 1932. A print of a wider view is widely reproduced, within for example Ryūichi Kaneko, "The origins and development of Japanese art photography", chapter (pp. 100–141) within The History of Japanese Photography, plate 92 (p. 136). (Also widely reproduced is a print that inspection of the breaking waves reveals to be from a different negative.))

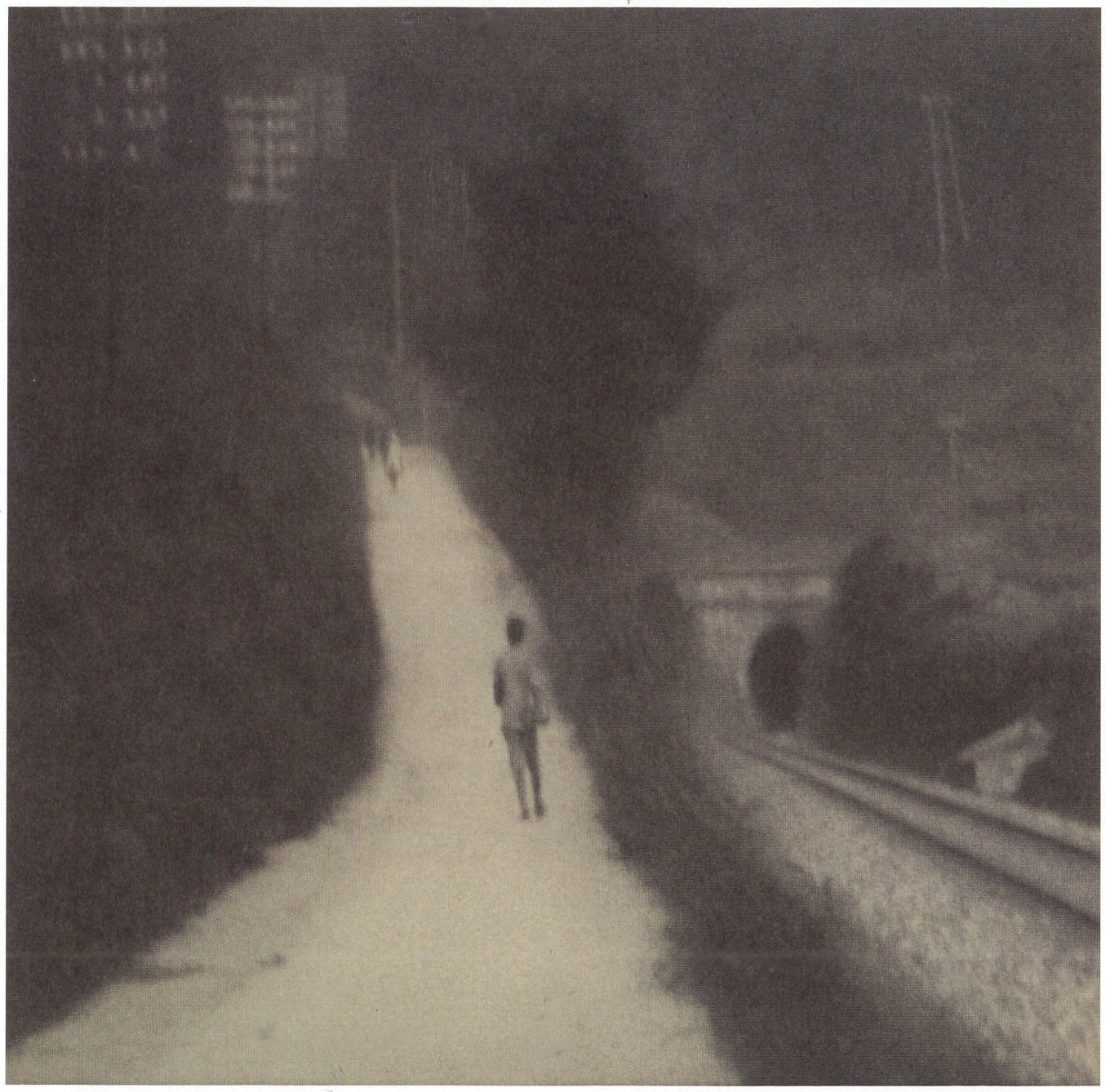
View with a Tunnel

View with Weather Forecast is not unusual in Shiotani's oeuvre in its altered proportions. View with a Tunnel (Tonneru no aru fūkei) of 1930 is known both with horizontal compression (as shown here) and without. Although it has a "pastoral atmosphere" without the compression, one has "a sense of unease" when viewing the compressed version. Alterations such as those used by Shiotani were widely used by the Surrealists for a disorienting effect, (Note: "The related concept of dépaysement, meaning dis-placement or dis-orientation, informed the isolation, fragmentation, and close cropping often seen in Surrealist photographs." Jodi Hauptman and Stephanie O'Rourke, "A surrealist fact" (PDF). In Mitra Abbaspour, Lee Ann Daffner, and Maria Morris Hambourg, eds, Object:Photo: Modern Photographs: The Thomas Walther Collection 1909–1949. An Online Project of The Museum of Modern Art. New York: The Museum of Modern Art, 2014.) and Takeuji surmises from this and from Shiotani's occasional photography of cemeteries and human bones that he may have been an early exponent of Surrealism in Japanese photography, although Surrealism in the visual arts was little known in Japan until later (1937) and the degree of Shiotani's awareness of Surrealist trends overseas is unknown.

Shiotani regarded himself as lucky to live in the provincial area of San'in, with its sea, sand dunes, rivers, Mt. Daisen and Mt. Senjō. Moreover, it had become an area of photographic excellence and experimentation. Younger photographers from the area followed in Shiotani's footsteps: most notably Yasuo Iwasa (岩佐保雄), and a little later Shōji Ueda, who went on to enjoy great success. Among the legends about Shiotani was that he was such a perfectionist that retouching just two square centimetres of a print could occupy him for a whole day. Ueda stated that Shiotani's rate of success in contests and his skills made him something like a god. (Note: Kami-sama ni chikai sonzai de atta (「神様にちかい存在であった」). Shōji Ueda, "Hajimete Shiotani-san ni" (はじめて塩谷さんに; Mr Shiotani for the first time), non-numbered page between pages 75 and 76 of Album 1923–1973, reprinted on pp. 6 and 268 of Itoshiki mono e, in Japanese and in English translation respectively. (The title only appears in the table of contents at the end of Album 1923–1973.))

=== Withdrawal ===
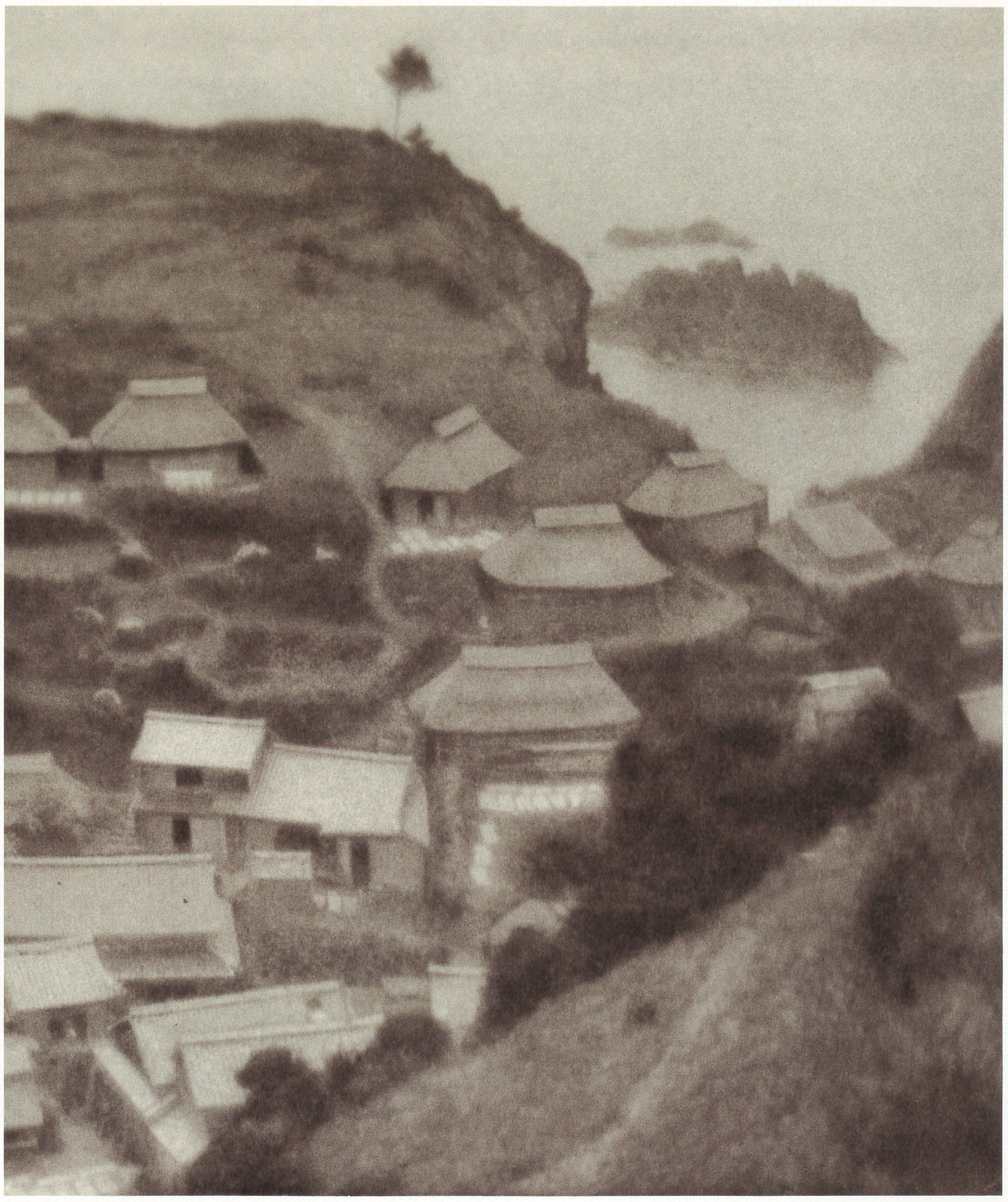
Bird's-Eye View of a Village, published in 1934

Shiotani gradually reduced his participation in photography at the national level during the 1930s. The last appearances of his photographs in Asahi Camera and The Photo-Times were in the October 1932 and June 1934 issues respectively. A series of twelve articles by him on techniques for The Photo-Times ended in September 1935. (Note: Six of these are reproduced in Itoshiki mono e, pp. 250–265; all twelve in The Legend in Art Photography, pp. 209–226.) Takeuji surmises that this gradual withdrawal was because his geijutsu photography was becoming eclipsed by the newer trend of more expressly modernist New Photography. (Note: Shinkō shashin (新興写真, literally "new photography") "differed strikingly from Pictorialism, which had been the leading form of art photography in Japan. The goal of the New Photography movement, which flourished from about 1930 on, was creative expression possible only through photography, making effective use of the mechanistic nature of the camera and lens." "The magazine and the new photography: Koga and Japanese modernism" (PDF file, press release for an exhibition). Tokyo Photographic Art Museum, 2018.) In the mid 30s, Shiotani returned to photographs he had taken from 1923 to 1925, printing them with less detail than previously, for an abstract and dreamlike effect. An example singled out for praise by Nakajima and often reproduced is Bird's-Eye View of a Village of 1934. (Note: Mura no chōkan (村の鳥瞰); photographed in August 1925; published in Geijutsu Shashin Kenkyū, October 1934, p. 155. Nakajima's comment is reproduced together with such a print in Itoshiki mono e, p. 27. The same or a similar print also appears in Album 1923–1973, plate 34; Uminari no fūkei, plate 19; The Age of Art Photography, plate 7, p. 33; Yume no kageri, plate 39, p. 64; and The Legend in Art Photography, plate s15, p. 24.)

In 1938, the Vest Club was renamed Shakenkai (写研会), and Shiotani continued to participate in it. (Its meetings are known to have continued until September 1942, and in October 1949 it was revived in Shiotani's house.) After the war, Shiotani opened a photo studio next to his house and also continued photographing for his own interest, remaining faithful to his earlier subject matter but making rather larger prints than before and avoiding darkroom manipulation and retouching. He participated in some local exhibitions, but also submitted his prints to the exhibitions in Tokyo of the art organization Shinkyō (新協美術展).

=== Later years ===
The emphasis by postwar Japanese photography publishing on the documentary rendered outmoded geijutsu photography as had been practised by Shiotani (and rendered "New Photography" outmoded as well). However, a 1968 exhibition of the first hundred years of Japanese photography "effectuated a great turning point in how photography was understood [in Japan] and established a comprehensive canon of photographers, thereby rewriting the history of Japanese photography": although it included no photograph by Shiotani, it did display 56 examples of geijutsu photography of the period. (Note: The exhibition: Shashin hyakunen: Nihonjin ni yoru shashin hyōgen no rekishi (写真100年 日本人による写真表現の歴史; One hundred years of photography: The history of Japanese photographic expression), Seibu, Ikebukuro, Tokyo, June 1968. The exhibits are listed in a catalogue of the same title: NCID BA83773233; OCLC 17234413.)

Shiotani was hospitalized from December 1974 to March 1975. The following month he had a one-man exhibition, Album 1923–1973, in the Asahi Pentax Gallery in Tokyo. If the 1968 exhibition had revived public interest in pictorialist photography, then the book Album 1923–1973, published in the autumn of 1975 and the first book devoted to Shiotani, made his photography widely known again, as well as prompting its acquisition by several museums. Edited by Shiotani's great admirer Shōji Ueda and printed and published in Yonago (Tottori), this was later one of only four books (Note: The other books: Yukiguni (雪国) by Hiroshi Hamaya, Nojima Yasuzō isakushū (野島康造遺作集) by Yasuzō Nojima, Tōkyō Shōwa jūichinen (東京昭和十一年) by Kineo Kuwabara.) of pre-1945 photography to be profiled in Ryūichi Kaneko and Ivan Vartanian's survey Japanese Photobooks of the 1960s and '70s.

During a visit to Japan in 1978, Lorenzo Merlo, head of the Canon Amsterdam gallery, encountered Album 1923–1973; the book so impressed him that Shiotani was included among "Eight Masters of the Twentieth Century" in an exhibition that was first shown in Bologna in 1979 and that subsequently travelled around Europe. During a stay in Japan in 1981, Manfred Heiting, who was planning photography exhibitions for Photokina, visited Shiotani in Akasaki; the next year, Shiotani exhibited, with 17 others, in Fotografie 1922–1982, held as part of Photokina. Curated by Heiting and described by the reviewer for Popular Photography as "the pièce de résistance of the [Photokina] picture shows, without a doubt" and a "magnificent exhibition", this presented Shiotani, Eliot Porter and Jean Dieuzaide as three exponents of the Pencil of Nature. (Note: The title alludes to that of the first published photobook, Fox Talbot's The Pencil of Nature.) Susumu Shiotani (塩谷晋) accepted a crystal obelisk at Photokina on his grandfather's behalf.

The Photokina show led to publication in the magazines Camera Arts (US) and Zoom (France). Shiotani's inclusion in Photofest 1988 (Museum of Fine Arts, Houston) led to a solo exhibition that toured seven US cities until 1990; a review of it said that Akasaki:

is [Shiotani's] ancestral home, a fishing village in the Tottori Prefecture of central Japan, and his entire world. ... The images are somehow gentle, like the passing of one season into the next or the process of growing older, a change that is never harsh or self-proclamatory – you just simply notice it one day. He has focused on the landscape, the people and the objects they use, framing them into harmonious compositions and imbuing them with affection.

From 1973 to 1983, Shiotani often contributed to Jun Watanabe's quarterly magazine Kōdai (光大). (Note: The material is reproduced in The Legend in Art Photography, pp. 247–253.)

The Vest Pocket Kodak and large-format camera were not the only cameras Shiotani used – in 1975, he wrote that he was still using the former but also a Piccolette (Note: The Piccolette is very similar to the Vest Pocket Kodak: see this description (Camera-Wiki).) and a Rolleicord – but in his eighties he continued to use the lens of the Vest Pocket Kodak, attached to a Pentax Spotmatic 35 mm camera.

Shiotani said to his fellow photographers:

You have to look for beauty close to hand. It is important that you find beauty in ordinary, daily life; there is no need to travel long distances to photograph. Subjects exist all around you. You must sharpen your sensitivity and discover the beauty in your local environment.

Shiotani died on 28 October 1988.

== Legacy ==
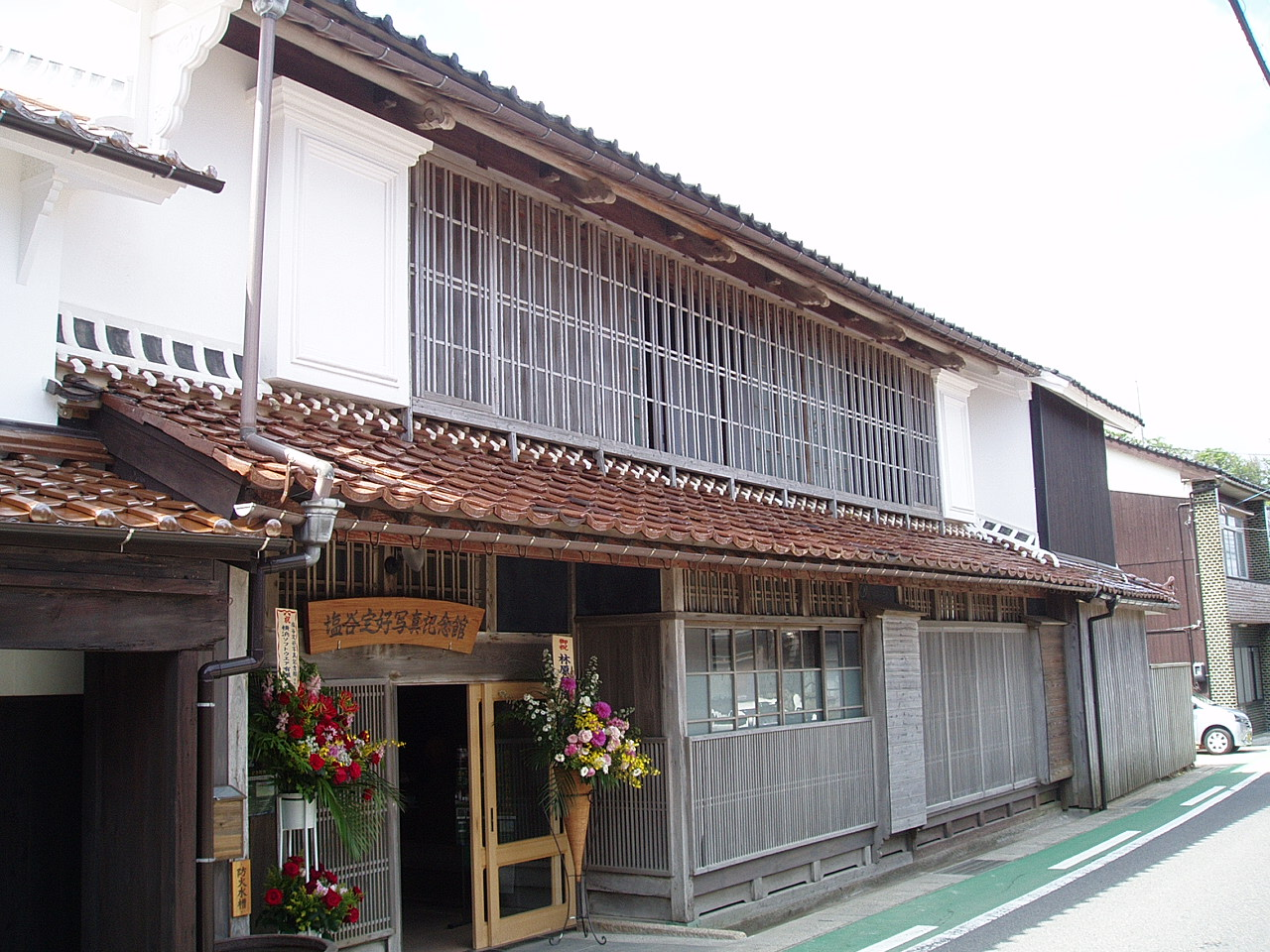
Teiko Shiotani Memorial Photo Gallery (Note: The building stands at 35°30′48.67″N 133°39′1.72″E.)

In 2014, hundreds of prints from the Shiotani family's collection, and many other related materials, were donated to the Shimane Art Museum. According to the chief curator of the museum, "His work [had] been meticulously preserved for eighty years, this miraculous collection remaining in perfect condition." The Tottori Prefectural Museum also has a large number of his prints. As of 2022, six books largely or completely devoted to his work have been published in Japan.

In April of the same year, the Teiko Shiotani Memorial Photo Gallery opened in a building of the Shiotani family's in Akasaki. It is run by a nonprofit organization, the Shiotani Teikō Photo Project (塩谷定好フォトプロジェクト). Constructed in 1874, this two-storey building was registered as a Tangible Cultural Property of Japan in November 2017. (Note: For photographs and other information, see "Teiko Shiotani Memorial Photo Gallery", Japan Travel Planner, ANA. The building should not be confused with the Shiotani family house, built in 1906 and registered as a Tangible Cultural Property of Japan at the same time. [https://kunishitei.bunka.go.jp/heritage/detail/101/00010882 塩谷定好写真記念館主屋], 登録有形文化財 (建造物), 国指定文化財等データベース, Agency for Cultural Affairs.)

== Awards ==
- Photokina Prize of Honor, 1982.
- Tottori Prefecture Education Prize (Tottori-ken kyōiku shō, 鳥取県教育賞), 1982.
- Regional Cultural Merits Award (Chiiki-bunka kōrōsha Monbu-daijin hyōshō, 地域文化功労者文部大臣表彰), 1983.
- Distinguished Contributions award, Photographic Society of Japan awards, 1983.
- Honorary citizen of Kotoura, 2010 (Kotoura-machi meiyo chōmin jushō, 琴浦町名誉町民受賞), 2010. (Note: As of July 2019, Shiotani was the sole recipient of this honour. 【町民の声】小林繁野球記念館等について (responding to a question about the possibility of a similar honour for Shigeru Kobayashi), Kotoura Town.)

== Exhibitions ==
=== Solo exhibitions ===
- Shiotani Teikō sakuhin-ten (塩谷定好作品展; Exhibition of works of Teikō Shiotani). Akasaki Agricultural Management Center (Akasaki Nōgyō Kanri Sentā, 赤碕農業管理センター), Akasaki, September 1971. 200 works.
- Shiotani Teikō kaiko-ten (塩谷定好回顧展覧; Teikō Shiotani retrospective exhibition). Yonago Art Gallery U, Yonago, Tottori. October 1971. 50 works. (The gallery belonged to Shōji Ueda.)
- Shiotani Teikō meisaku-ten "Album 1923–1973" (塩谷定好名作展<Album 1923–1973>; Exhibition of celebrated works by Teikō Shiotani, Album 1923–1973). Pentax Gallery, Tokyo, April 1975. In conjunction with publication of a photobook.
- Uminari no fūkei (海鳴りの風景; Scenery of the sound of the sea). Ginza Nikon Salon, Ginza, Tokyo; followed by Shinjuku Nikon Salon, Shinjuku, Tokyo; and Osaka Nikon Salon, Osaka. 1984. In conjunction with publication of a photobook.
- The Photography of Teikoh Shiotani, (Note: This is the title of the show at Los Angeles. The titles used for the earlier shows are not known, but a review of the show at Houston credits the photographs to "Sadayoshi Shiotani", and newspaper notices of the shows at Madison and Detroit credit them to "Teiko Shiotani".) organized by the Center for Contemporary Arts of Santa Fe,"a solo exhibition of [Shiotani's] work, which toured seven cities in the United States including Los Angeles, Detroit and Santa Fe until 1990." (Note: Tomoko Takeuji, "Shiotani Teiko and Art Photography"; within The Age of Art Photography. Among the venues were the Elvehjem Museum of Art, Madison, Wisconsin, in February 1989 (see "Shiotani photos", Wisconsin State Journal, 21 February 1989, p. 15), Doizaki Gallery, Japanese American Cultural and Community Center, Los Angeles, in May–July 1989 (see Zan Dubin, "Pictorialist's art of '20s–'30s at Japanese Center", Los Angeles Times, 14 May 1989), and the Detroit Institute of Arts, in August 1989 (see "Exhibits", Hillsdale Daily News, 10 August 1989, p. 14).)
- Bijutsukan wo kangaeru 365-hi: Tottori kenritsu hakubutsukan shozō bijutsuhin-ten: Yonago-ten: Shashinka Shiotani Teikō no sekai 1 (美術館を考える365日 鳥取県立博物館所蔵美術品展 米子展 写真家塩谷定好の世界1; Thinking about art galleries 365 days: Exhibition of the artworks in Tottori prefectural museum collections: Yonago exhibition: The world of the photographer Teikō Shiotani, 1). Yonago City Museum of Art, July–August 2000.
- Bijutsukan wo kangaeru 365-hi: Tottori kenritsu hakubutsukan shozō bijutsuhin-ten: Kurayoshi-ten: Shashinka Shiotani Teikō no sekai 2 (美術館を考える365日 鳥取県立博物館所蔵美術品展 倉吉展 写真家塩谷定好の世界2; Thinking about art galleries 365 days: Exhibition of the artworks in Tottori prefectural museum collections: Kurayoshi exhibition: The world of the photographer Teikō Shiotani, 2). Kurayoshi Museum, Kurayoshi, Tottori, July–August 2000.
- Bijutsukan wo kangaeru 365-hi: Tottori kenritsu hakubutsukan shozō bijutsuhin-ten: Tottori-ten Part 7: Shashinka Shiotani Teikō no sekai (美術館を考える365日 鳥取県立博物館所蔵美術品展 鳥取展 part 7 写真家塩谷定好の世界; Thinking about art galleries 365 days: Exhibition of the artworks in Tottori prefectural museum collections: Tottori exhibition part 7: The world of the photographer Teikō Shiotani). Tottori Prefectural Museum, Tottori city, February–March 2001.
- Shiotani Teikō shashin-ten (塩谷定好写真展; Shiotani Teiko photography exhibition). Kawamoto residence, Kotoura, Tottori, 2010.
- Shiotani Teikō kaiko-ten (塩谷定好回顧展) = Teiko Shiotani's Retrospective. Manabi Town Tōhaku exhibition hall (まなびタウンとうはく 展示ホール; Kotoura, Tottori), November 2011.
- Shiotani Teikō sakuhin-ten (塩谷定好作品展; Exhibition of the works of Teikō Shiotani). Manabi Town Tōhaku exhibition hall, Kotoura, Tottori, November 2012.
- Shiotani Teikō sakuhin-ten "Furusato to shizen wo shitau: Part II" (塩谷定好作品展「ふるさとと自然を慕うPart II」; Exhibition of the works of Teikō Shiotani: Longing for where I come from, and nature). Teiko Shiotani Memorial Photo Gallery, October 2014 – March 2015.
- Shirarezaru Nihon geijutsu shashin paionia Shiotani Teikō shashin (知られざる日本芸術写真パイオニア塩谷定好写真) = Teiko Shiotani: Pioneer of Artistic Photography in Japan. Photo History Museum, Fujifilm Square, Tokyo, May–July 2015.
- Shiotani Teikō no shijō (塩谷定好の詩情; The poetic sentiment of Teikō Shiotani). Teiko Shiotani Memorial Photo Gallery, April–September 2015.
- Geijutsu toshite no shashin (芸術としての写真) = Pictorialism. Teiko Shiotani Memorial Photo Gallery, October 2015 – March 2016.
- Geijutsu-shashin no jidai: Shiotani Teikō-ten (芸術写真の時代 塩谷定好展) = Shiotani Teiko 1899–1988. Mitaka City Gallery of Art, Mitaka, Tokyo, August–October 2016. Accompanied by a catalogue.
- Kurashikku foto no tanoshimi (クラシックフォトの楽しみ; The enjoyment of classic photos). Teiko Shiotani Memorial Photo Gallery, April–September 2016.
- Shashin no bikan (写真の美観; The beauty of photographs). Teiko Shiotani Memorial Photo Gallery, October 2016 – March 2017.
- Itoshiki mono e: Shiotani Teikō 1899–1988 (愛しきものへ 塩谷定好 1899–1988) = To Things Beloved: Shiotani Teikō 1899–1988. Shimane Art Museum (Matsue, Shimane), March–May 2017. Accompanied by a catalogue.
- Shizen no kokoro, watakushi no kokoro (自然のこころ 私のこころ; Nature's mind, my mind). Teiko Shiotani Memorial Photo Gallery, April–September 2017.
- Geijutsu shashin no ajiwai (芸術写真の味わい; The taste of art photography). Teiko Shiotani Memorial Photo Gallery, October 2017 – March 2018.
- Yasashisa no jōkei (やさしさの情景; Scenes of gentleness). Teiko Shiotani Memorial Photo Gallery, April–September 2018.
- Shashin no omomuki (写真の趣き; The grace of photographs). Teiko Shiotani Memorial Photo Gallery, October 2018 – March 2019.
- Geijutsu shashin no 100-nen (I) (芸術写真の100年 (I); 100 years of art photography (I)). Teiko Shiotani Memorial Photo Gallery, April–September 2019.
- Geijutsu shashin no 100-nen (II) (芸術写真の100年 (II); 100 years of art photography (II)). Teiko Shiotani Memorial Photo Gallery, October 2019 – March 2020.
- Seitan 120-nen kinen: Shiotani Teikō (生誕120年記念 塩谷定好; 120th anniversary of birth: Teikō Shiotani). Shimane Art Museum, August–November 2019. Accompanied by publication of a book.
- Seitan 120-nen: Geijutsu-shashin no kamisama Shiotani Teikō to sono jidai (生誕120年 芸術写真の神様 塩谷定好とその時代) = The Legend in Art Photography: Teikoh Shiotani and His Contemporaries. Tottori Prefectural Museum, Tottori City, November–December 2019. (Note: The "contemporaries" covered in the exhibition and catalogue: Shōtarō Adachi, Masao Ayame (綾女正雄), Hakuyō Fuchikami, Shinzō Fukuhara, Rosō Fukuhara, Hakuyō Fukumori, Kiichirō Ishida (石田喜一郎), Yasuo Iwasa (岩佐保雄), Shōtarō Koseki, Seiken Kumagai (熊谷清憲), Fujio Matsugi, Kō Minami (南孝), Seizō Murakami (村上誠三), Iwata Nakayama, Yasuzō Nojima, Hasui Osaki (尾崎坡碎), Hokutō Saigō (西郷北濤), Hōkō Shimamura, Reiichirō Takashima (高島怜一郎), Masataka Takayama, Sakae Tamura, Shōji Ueda, Ōri Umesaka, Jun Watanabe, Makihiko Yamamoto, Nakaji Yasui, Sōgetsu Yoshida (吉田窓月). (As an indication of the emphasis on Shiotani, 128 pages of the catalogue are devoted to plates of his work; 62 pages to plates of work by all the other photographers.)) Accompanied by a catalogue.
- Furusato to shashin (ふるさとと写真; The old village and photographs). Teiko Shiotani Memorial Photo Gallery, April–September 2020.
- Dō to sei no bi (動と静の美; The beauty of movement and stillness). Teiko Shiotani Memorial Photo Gallery, October 2020 – March 2021.
- Oto o kanaderu shashin (音を奏でる写真; Photographs playing sounds). Teiko Shiotani Memorial Photo Gallery, April–September 2021.
- Monokuro ni miru shikisai (モノクロにみる色彩; Colours seen in monochrome). Teiko Shiotani Memorial Photo Gallery, October 2021 – March 2022.
- Kaze no yuragi (風のゆらぎ; Swaying in the wind). Teiko Shiotani Memorial Photo Gallery, April–September 2022.

=== Joint exhibitions ===
The list is selective, and omits mention of any of the exhibitions between 1926 and 1940. The chronologies provided in the 21st-century books about Shiotani give more information.

- Dai-ikkai besutan-ha Kōdai ten (第1回ベス単派光大展; First new besu-tan group Kōdai exhibition). Pentax Gallery, Tokyo, 1973.
- Fotografia Giapponese dal 1848 ad Oggi. Galleria d'Arte Moderna, Bologna, January–February 1979. Travelling to Palazzo Reale (Milan), Palais des Beaux Arts (Brussels), ICA (London), in 1979; Museum für Kunst und Gewerbe (Hamburg), Gemeentemuseum (Arnhem), Pulchri Studio (Gemeentemuseum, The Hague), CFF (Stockholm), American Center (Paris), in 1980; Finnish Museum of Photography (Helsinki), Kunstgewerbemuseum (Zürich), in 1981; Jerusalem, in 1982. Included works by Shiotani as one of "Eight Masters of the Twentieth Century" (the others being Eikoh Hosoe, Ikkō Narahara, Kishin Shinoyama, Issei Suda, Haruo Tomiyama, Hiromi Tsuchida and Shōji Ueda). Accompanied by a book in Italian and one in English.
- Fotografie 1922–82 = Photography 1922–82. Photokina, Josef-Haubrich-Kunsthalle, Cologne, September–October 1982. With Walter Peterhans, Otto Steinert, John Batho, František Drtikol, Paul Outerbridge, Helmut Newton, Edward Weston, Ansel Adams, Frederick Sommer, Friedrich Seidenstücker, Robert Frank, Timm Rautert, Charles Sheeler, Luigi Ghirri, André Thijssen, Eliot Porter, Jean Dieuzaide. Accompanied by a catalogue.
- Shiotani Teikō, Ueda Shōji shashin-ten (塩谷定好・植田正治写真展; Teikō Shiotani and Shōji Ueda photograph exhibition). Tottori Prefectural Museum, Tottori City, February 1983; Kurayoshi Museum, Kurayoshi, May 1983; Yonago City Museum of Art, August 1983. 100 works by Shiotani, 185 by Ueda.
- The Art of Modern Japanese Photography. Photofest 1988. Museum of Fine Arts, Houston, February–March 1988. Three simultaneous exhibitions: one of Shiotani (which proceeded to tour the US), one of Shōji Ueda, and The Art of Modern Japanese Photography, of work from 1920 to 1940 by 29 photographers, Shiotani (and Ueda) among them.
- Geijutsu shashin no jidai: Yonago Shayūkai kaikoten: Taishō makki — Shōwa shoki (芸術写真の時代 米子写友会回顧展 大正末期〜昭和初期; The age of art photography: Retrospective exhibition of the Yonago Photography Circle: From the end of Taishō to early Shōwa). Yonago City Museum of Art, Yonago, Tottori, 1990. Five prints by Shiotani. Accompanied by a catalogue.
- Modern Photography in Japan 1915–1940. Ansel Adams Center, San Francisco. June–September 2001. Four prints by Shiotani. Accompanied by a catalogue.
- Shashin hyōgen no senkusha-tachi Shiotani Teikō, Ueda Shōji, Iwamiya Takeji, Kijima Takashi (写真表現の先駆者塩谷定好・植田正治・岩宮武二・杵島隆; Teikō Shiotani, Shōji Ueda, Takeji Iwamiya, Takashi Kijima: Pioneers of photographic expression). Tottori Prefectural Museum (Tottori City), March–April 2013.
- Ueda Shōji to sono jidai: Seitan 100-nen (植田正治とその時代 生誕100年; Shōji Ueda and his time: 100th anniversary of his birth). Shimane Art Museum, April–July 2013.
- Japan Modern: Photography from the Gloria Katz and Willard Huyck Collection, curated by Carol Huh. Freer Gallery of Art and Arthur M. Sackler Gallery, Smithsonian Institution, Washington, D.C. September 2018 – January 2019.

== Collections ==
- Tokyo Photographic Art Museum. Ten prints.
- Yonago City Museum of Art.
- Shimane Art Museum (Matsue, Shimane).
- Tottori Prefectural Museum (Tottori City).
- Mitaka City Gallery of Art (Mitaka, Tokyo).
- Yokohama Museum of Art. Ten prints.
- Fujifilm Photo Collection (Tokyo). One print.
- Museum of Fine Arts, Houston. Five prints.
- J. Paul Getty Museum (Brentwood, Los Angeles). Seven prints.
- Freer Gallery of Art and Arthur M. Sackler Gallery, Smithsonian Institution (Washington, DC). One print.

== Publication of Shiotani's works ==
=== Books largely devoted to Shiotani ===
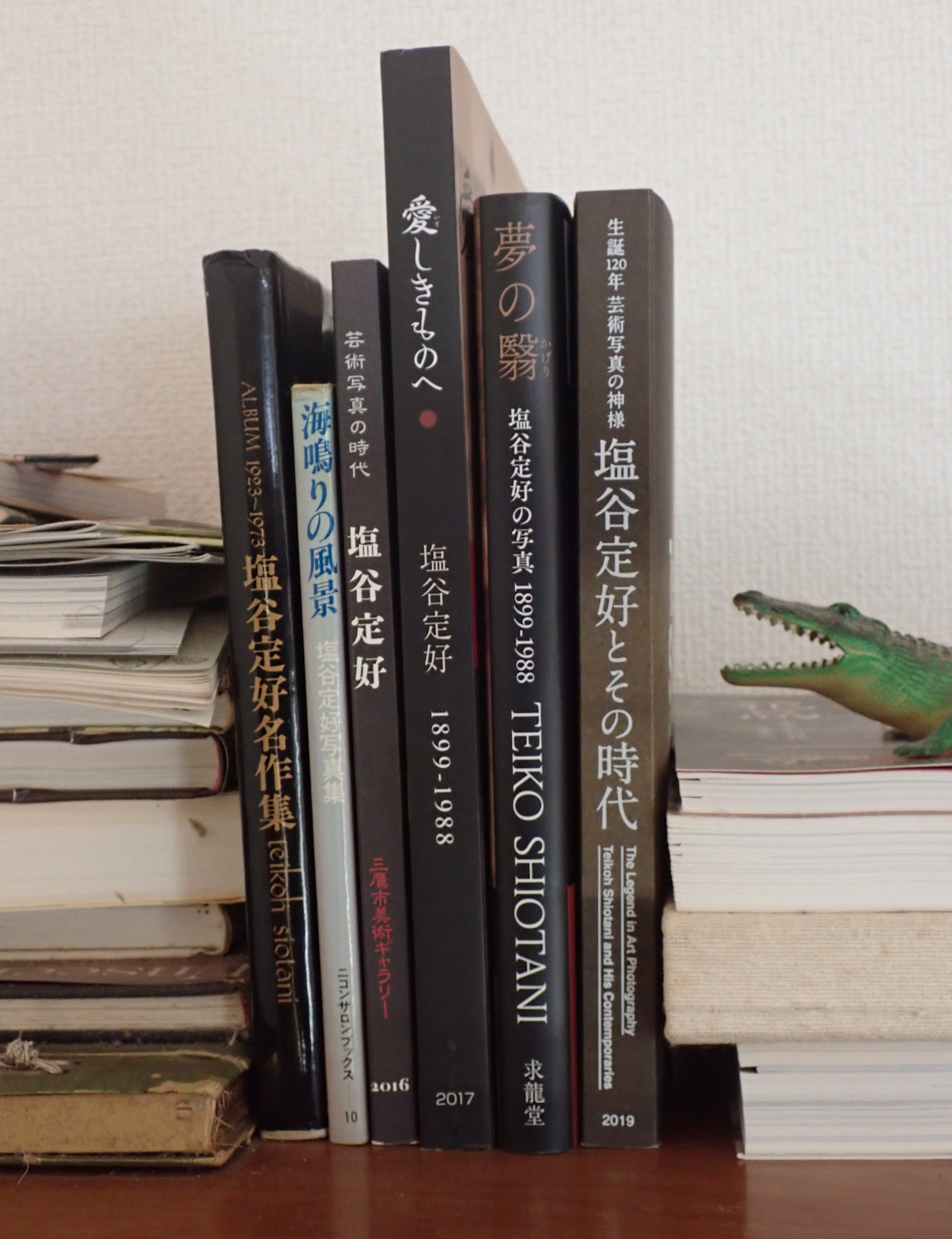
Six photobooks of Shiotani's work

- Shiotani Teikō meisakushū: 1923–1973 (塩谷定好名作集 1923–1973) = Album 1923–1973: Teikoh Siotani. Yonago, Tottori: Nihon Shashin Shuppan, 1975. Edited by Shōji Ueda; with texts by Shiotani, Ueda, Makihiko Yamamoto, Hachirō Suzuki and Eiichi Sakurai. NCID BN15144666; OCLC 703803365. Despite the alternative title in English, captions and texts are in Japanese only. Publication was accompanied by an exhibition.
- Uminari no fūkei: Shiotani Teikō shashinshū (海鳴りの風景 塩谷定好写真集) = Teikoh Shiotani Portfolio 1923–1973. Nikon Salon Books 10. Tokyo: Nikkor Club, 1984. NCID BN15144928; OCLC 755064990. Despite the alternative title in English, text and captions are in Japanese only. With 95 plates (each on its own page), essays, an interview and other material; edited by Jun Miki. Publication (distribution to members of the Nikkor Club) was accompanied by an exhibition.
- Geijutsu shashin no jidai: Shiotani-Teikō-ten katarogu (芸術写真の時代 塩谷定好展 カタログ) = The Age of Art Photography: Shiotani Teiko Exhibition Catalogue. Mitaka, Tokyo: Mitaka City Gallery of Art and Mitaka City Sports and Culture Foundation, 2016. The catalogue of an exhibition. One hundred plates; all texts in both Japanese and English. Edited by Yūichirō Asakura (浅倉祐一朗) and Yuki Ōtake (大竹ゆき); translated by Yukari Nakayama (中山ゆかり) and Tim Groves. NCID BB22168794. OCLC 986526024. (Note: There are bibliographic complexities. On the title page: The Age of Art Photography: Shiotani Teiko Exhibition Catalogue; on the colophon: The Age of Art Photography: Shiotani Teiko Exhibition; on the front cover: Shiotani Teiko 1899–1988. A description of The Age of Art Photography from its publisher.)
- Itoshiki mono e: Shiotani Teikō: 1899–1988 (愛しきものへ 塩谷定好1899–1988) = To things beloved: Shiotani Teikō 1899–1988. Over three hundred plates; most texts in both Japanese and English but some in Japanese only. Edited by Noriko Tsutatani (蔦谷典子); translated by Gavin Frew. Matsue, Shimane: Shimane Art Museum, 2017. NCID BB23337252. OCLC 988732104. The catalogue of an exhibition.
- Yume no kageri: Shiotani Teikō no shashin 1899–1988 (夢の翳 塩谷定好の写真1899–1988) = Teiko Shiotani. Edited by Noriko Tsutatani. Tokyo: Kyūryūdō, 2019. ISBN 978-4-7630-1920-2. With 136 plates by Shiotani. For each plate, the caption and the name of the collection from which the print comes are provided in both Japanese and English; all other text is in Japanese only. (Note: Description of Yume no kageri from its publisher. An article about its publication: 奥平真也, 「芸術写真」塩谷定好写真集 県美の蔦谷さん出版, Asahi Shimbun, 16 November 2019.) Not a catalogue, but its publication accompanied an exhibition.
- Seitan 120-nen geijutsu-shashin no kamisama Shiotani Teikō to sono jidai (生誕120年 芸術写真の神様 塩谷定好とその時代) = The Legend in Art Photography: Teikoh Shiotani and His Contemporaries. [Yonago, Tottori]: Imai Shuppan, 2019. ISBN 978-4-86611-176-6. The catalogue of an exhibition. With 128 pages of plates by Shiotani. For each plate, a caption is provided in both Japanese and English; all other text is in Japanese only. (Note: Description of The Legend in Art Photography from its publisher.)

=== Other appearances ===
A selective list, in chronological order:

- "Shiotani Teikō sakuhin-sen (塩谷定好作品撰; Selected works of Teikō Shiotani). Pp. 35–42 within Nippon Camera, June 1976. Eight photographs by Shiotani (with a brief note by Shōji Ueda on pp. 130–131).
- Attilio Colombo, Isabella Doniselli, Lorenzo Merlo, et al. Fotografia Giapponese dal 1848 ad Oggi. Bologna: Grafis, 1979. OCLC 500308478. Italian-language book accompanying a travelling exhibition. Pages 96–103 are devoted to "Sadayoshi Shiotani", and show seven of his photographs.
- Attilio Colombo, Isabella Doniselli, Lorenzo Merlo, et al. Japanese Photography Today and Its Origin. Bologna: Grafis, 1979. ISBN 0906333067. Book accompanying a travelling exhibition; introductory texts in English and French, other texts in English only. Pages 96–103 are devoted to "Sadayoshi Shiotani", and show seven of his photographs.
- Manfred Heiting, ed. Fotografie 1922–82 = Photography 1922–82. Cologne: KölnMesse, 1982. ISBN 3980073009. In German and English; catalogue of an exhibition. Pages 223–235 are devoted to Shiotani, showing 31 of his works (24 of which appear on just two pages). (Note: The pages of Fotografie 1922–82 = Photography 1922–82 that are devoted to Shiotani are reproduced in miniature in Itoshiki mono e, p. 221.)
- "Fotokina shashinten kara Shiotani Teikō no sekai" (フォトキナ写真展から塩谷定好の世界) = "World of Sadayoshi Shiotani: From Photokina picture exhibitions 'Photography 1922–1982'." Pp. 23–30 within Nippon Camera, December 1982. Eight photographs by Shiotani (with a brief note by Takao Kajiwara 梶原高男 on p. 121).
- Geijutsu shashin no nenpu (芸術写真の年譜 = The Heritage of Art Photography in Japan. Nihon shashin zenshū (日本写真全集) = The Complete History of Japanese Photography 2. Tokyo: Shogakukan, 1986. ISBN 4-09-582002-0. Despite its alternative English title, virtually all of the book is in Japanese only. Plates 115–120 (pp. 116–120) are by Shiotani.
- Photo Metro, March 1988. Contains 13 pages devoted to Shiotani. (Note: The pages of Photo Metro that are devoted to Shiotani are reproduced in miniature in Itoshiki mono e, p. 221. (Photo Metro was published in San Francisco and distributed free of charge.))
- Norihiko Matsumoto, ed. A Collection of Japanese Photographs 1912–1940. Tokyo: Shashinkosha, 1990. NCID BA73848507; OCLC 80195041. Despite its English title, the book is in Japanese only. Plates 11, 16, 38 and 40 are by Shiotani.
- Geijutsu shashin no jidai: Yonago Shayūkai kaikoten: Taishō makki – Shōwa shoki (芸術写真の時代 米子写友会回顧展 大正末期〜昭和初期; The age of art photography: Retrospective exhibition of the Yonago Photography Circle: From the end of Taishō to early Shōwa). Yonago City Museum of Art, Yonago, Tottori, 1990. Catalogue of an exhibition. Five plates, on pp. 22, 68–69.
- Shigeichi Nagano, Kōtarō Iizawa and Naoyuki Kinoshita, eds. Takayama Masataka to Taishō pikutoriarizumu (高山正隆と大正ピクトリアリズム) = Takayama Masataka and the Pictorialists of the Taisho Era. Nihon no shashinka 5. Tokyo: Iwanami Shoten, 1998. ISBN 4-00-008345-7. Despite its alternative English title, the book is in Japanese only. Plates 24–31 are by Shiotani.
- Deborah Klochko, ed. Modern Photography in Japan 1915–1940. San Francisco: The Friends of Photography, 2001. ISBN 0-933286-74-0. Catalogue of an exhibition. The plates are not numbered but are alphabetically ordered by photographer; there are four by Shiotani.
- Sandrine Bailly. Une saison au Japon. Paris: La Martinière. 2009. ISBN 978-2732438634. With five photographs by Shiotani.
  - Japan: Season by Season. New York: Abrams, 2009. ISBN 9780810983823. English-language edition, with five photographs by Shiotani (on pp. 351, 356, 359, 364, 365).
- "Hikari no tezawari 1929–40-nen: Nihon no kindai shashin (Noguchi Rika sen)" (光の手ざわり 1929〜40年 日本の近代写真 (野口里佳選); The touch of light 1929–40: Modern photography of Japan (selected by Rika Noguchi)), pp. 80–113 within Photographica, vol. 21, Spring 2011 (special issue on Rika Noguchi). ISBN 978-4844361718. Contains seven photographs by Shiotani.

== Other books cited ==
- Kaneko, Ryūichi, and Ivan Vartanian. Japanese Photobooks of the 1960s and '70s. New York: Aperture, 2009. ISBN 978-1-59711-094-5.
- Tucker, Anne Wilkes, et al. The History of Japanese Photography. New Haven, CT: Yale University Press, 2003. ISBN 0-300-09925-8 (hardback); ISBN 0-89090-112-0 (paperback).
