= Shōji Ueda =

Japanese photographer (1913–2000)

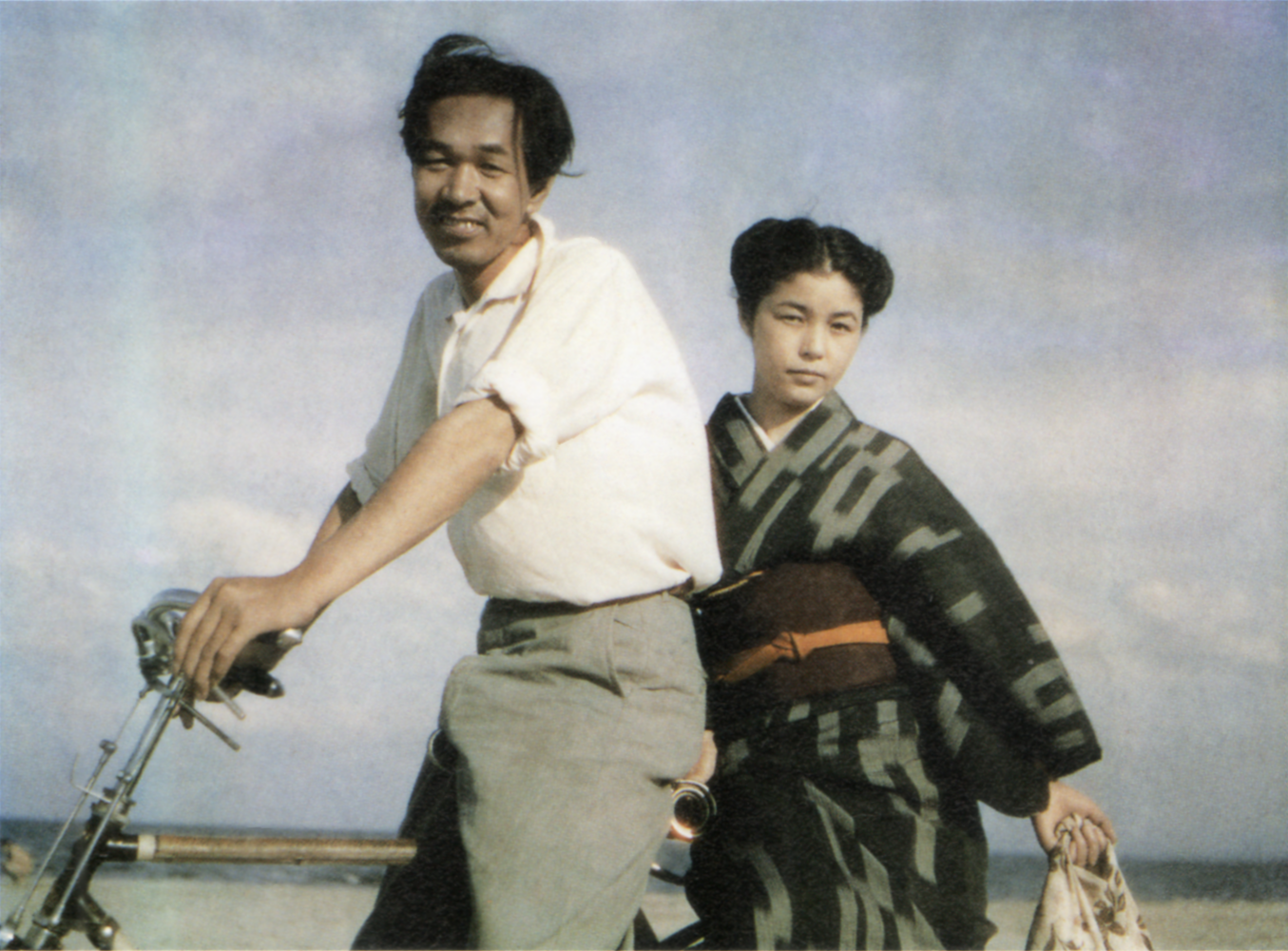
- Born: 27 March 1913; Sakaiminato
- Died: 4 July 2000 (aged 87); Sakaiminato
- Known for: Photography

Shōji Ueda (植田 正治, Ueda Shōji; 27 March 1913 – 4 July 2000) was a Japanese photographer from Tottori, best known for his distinctive, dreamlike black-and-white images with staged figures, taken on the Tottori sand dunes. The term Ueda-chō (Ueda-tone) has been used to refer to his cool and mysterious atmospheric style.

Ueda began using posed figures and objects in his photographs in 1939, but would be forced to cease his production due to Japan's participation in World War II. His surreal Sand Dune series, of which the first images were published 1949, was overshadowed by the predominance of social realism, a major trend in Japanese post-war photography.

His oeuvre was reconsidered by critics in 1971 after the publication of the widely-appreciated photobook Warabe Goyomi (Children the Year Round), containing images of children which masterfully balanced social realism and the playfulness of Ueda's posed pictures. Since the 1970s, his work has won him international renown, and in 1995 the Ueda Shōji Museum of Photography was inaugurated.

Throughout the entirety of his life, Ueda remained deeply attached to his native San'in region, and in particular his hometown of Sakaiminato.

== Biography ==
=== Early life and career beginnings ===
Ueda Shōji was born to a merchant family in the port town of Sakaiminato, Tottori prefecture, on the western coast of the Sea of Japan. As a teenager, he showed interest in being a painter, but he started taking photographs instead after his father gave him his first camera when he was fifteen.

He joined a local photography club, the Yonago Photography Circle, in 1931. Here, he learned about "art photography", which promoted a pictorialist style, popular amongst amateurs of photography in Japan at that time. He was particularly influenced by the pictorialist photographer Shiotani Teikō, his mentor. Ueda oversaw an important publication of Shiotani's work in 1975.

Ueda soon also became interested in shinko shashin or new photography, which looked to the European avant-gardes. Ueda discovered in the pages of the British magazine Modern Photography the work of André Kertész, Man Ray, Emmanuel Sougez and more. He notably retained the photographers' spirit of experimentation, which inspired him to create photograms, play with perspectives and toy with the framing of his images as he began to develop his own style.

During the year 1931, Ueda spent three months in Tokyo studying at the Oriental School of Photography, founded by the Oriental Photo Industry Company, the first business in Japan to produce photographic paper and material. His first professional photographic endeavor was the opening of a portrait studio in 1932, the Ueda Shashinjō. Ueda's business did well, but as time passed, he wanted to dedicate more time to his artistic photographic activity. Ueda's wife, Shiraishi Norie, whom he married in 1935, was supportive of him and took it upon herself to hire other photographers to take over his role at the studio.

From 1933 onwards, Ueda participated regularly in photography contests organized by magazines such as Asahi Camera. He also co-founded the Chūgoku Photographers Group, alongside Ishizu Ryōsuke, Masaoka Kunio, and Akira Nomura, which aimed to develop a modernist photography distinct from that of the major urban areas. They organized exhibitions in Nihonbashi, Tokyo so that they might gain recognition in Japan's artistic capital.

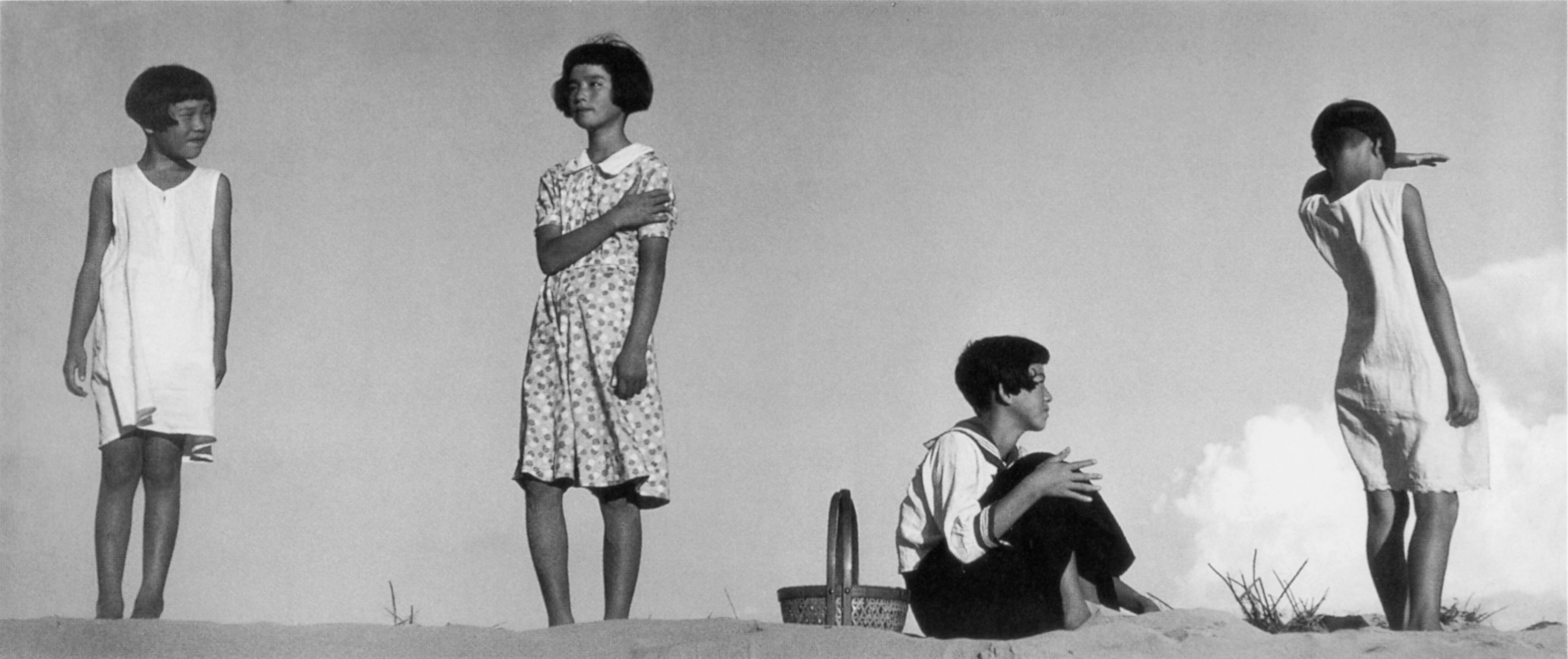
Shōji Ueda, Four girls, Four positions, 1939

Ueda's 1939 photograph Shōjo shi tai (Four Girls, Four Positions) was a significant turning point for the artist, marking the beginning of his staged pictures. The panoramic image features four young girls on a sandbank, each of them gazing seriously in a different direction, seemingly indifferent to the others' presence. Their nearly identical forms give rhythm to the empty space. The photo does not contain any singular narrative, rather its mysteriousness allows for ample interpretation.

Around 1940, Japan's involvement in World War II interrupted Ueda's artistic activity. The intensifying war effort brought about the end of free publication and photographic materials grew scarce. Additionally, Sakaiminato, a strategically important port city, was transformed by the presence of the army. Ueda's photo studio was briefly tasked with taking military portraits, but Ueda did not take on any war reportage or propaganda assignments, contrary to many professional photographers of the time. Ueda was called to serve in the war effort twice in 1943, but was dismissed both times due to his being malnourished. Ueda thus never participated in the war, and he would make no reference to it in his photographic works for the rest of his career.

=== Post-war career and Sand Dune series ===
During the tumultuous period following Japan's defeat, Ueda jumped on new opportunities to create again. He joined Ginryūsha, a Tokyo-based association of Japanese photographers active before the war, and came to know Kuwabara Kineo, editor of the influential photography magazine Camera. Kuwabara proposed that Ueda shoot a series of images of fellow photographer Domon Ken in the Tottori sand dunes, which were published in Camera in September 1949.

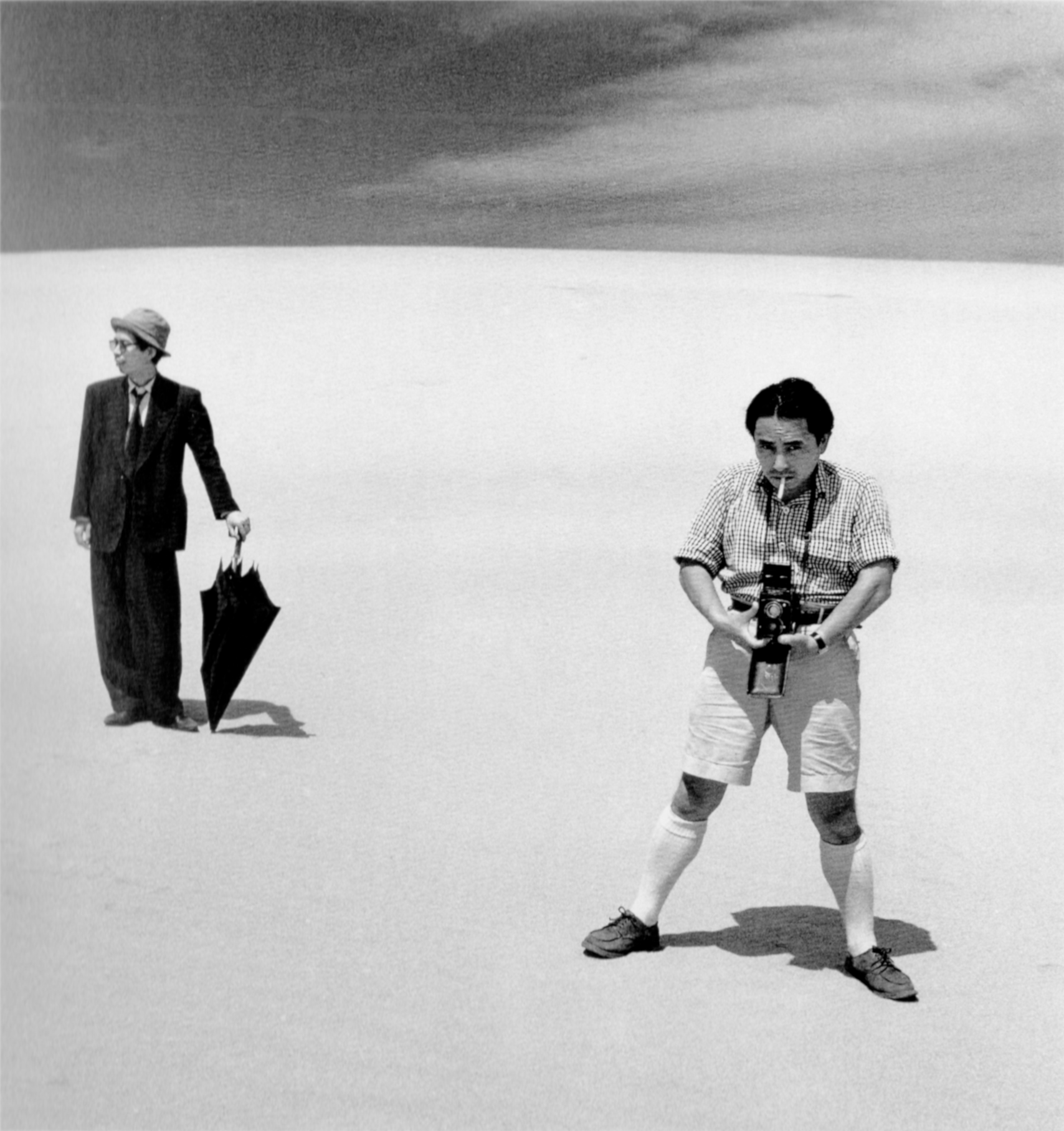
Shōji Ueda, Domon Ken and Ishizu Ryōsuke, 1949

Domon was a champion of the realism movement in Japanese post-war photography. He believed that the photographer's role was to attempt an objective depiction of society and to not divert their attention from social reality. The situation was undoubtedly grim in the years following Japan's surrender as citizens attempted to rebuild after a staggering defeat and adjusted to the American occupation.

Ueda, however, did not take an interest in realism, but rather returned to the staged photography that he had first undertaken in 1939. Art historian Yumi Kim Takenaka aptly describes his work at the time as follows: "Ueda's photographs seem to overflow with pleasure to be able to make his own photography freely again." There is indeed great joy and playfulness in his posed images, of which the most famous are those in which his wife and young children pose together in a lighthearted, humorous fashion. The barren landscape of the sand dunes lend a surreal quality to the figures, who seem to have appeared there out of thin air.

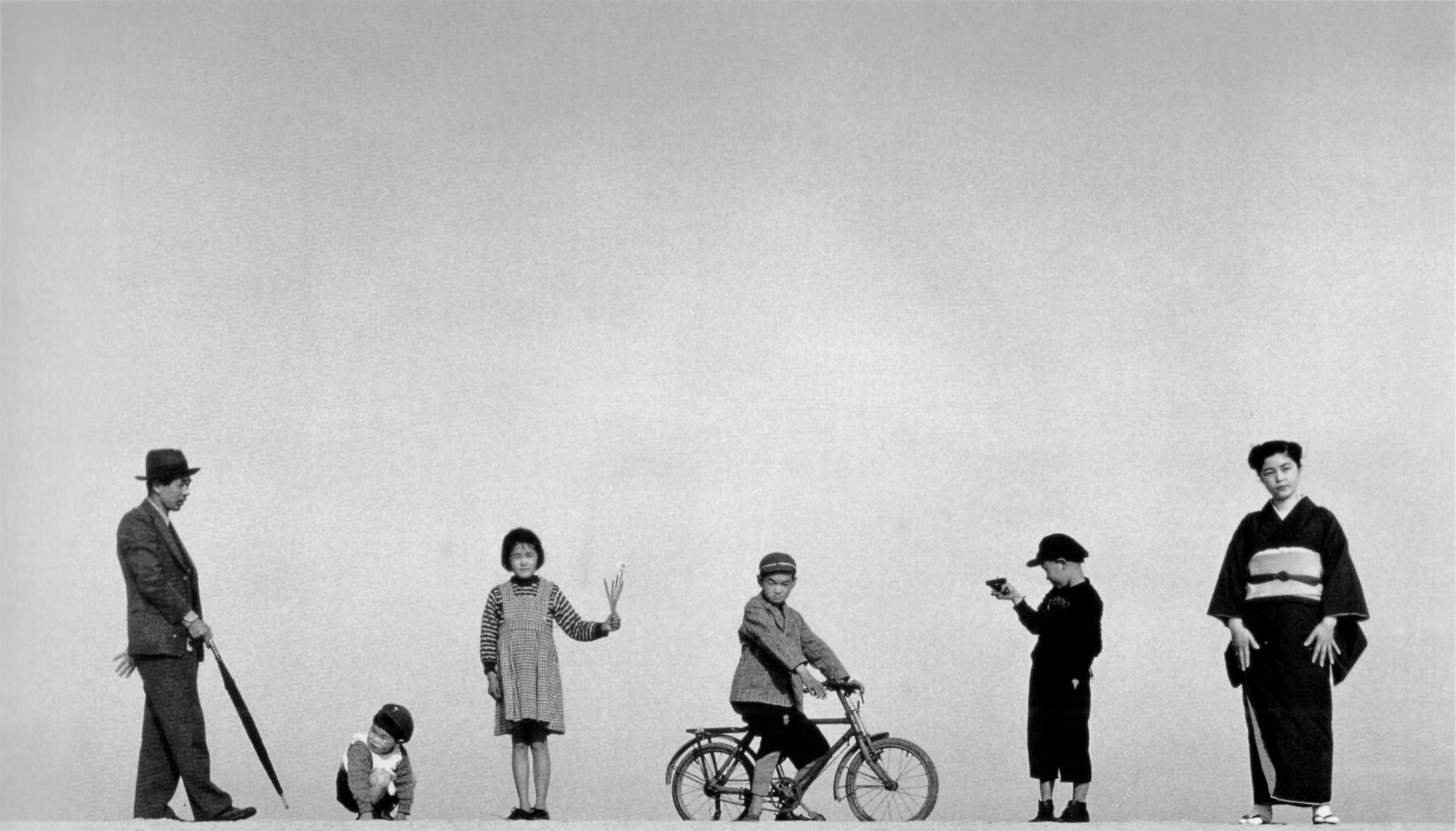
Shōji Ueda, Papa, Mama and the Children, 1949

Ueda's photography, unconcerned by the pursuit of realism, provoked some negative responses from contemporary Japanese critics. It is notable in this context that avid realist Domon himself praised Ueda, calling his compositional style "a delight created entirely by the thoughts and emotions of the artist". Reflecting back later on this period, Ueda wrote:

"The war had just ended. The wave of Social Realism was at its peak. The prestige of the absolute snapshot was overwhelming and critics heaped scorn on anything posed. In those stormy times, people like me saw no value in taking photographs; we turned on ourselves and sometimes lost hope."

Contrary to this statement, Ueda did not give up taking photography. In 1956, his works were included in the First International Subjective Photography Exhibition. Held in the same year that the newly founded Japan Subjective Photography League was established, the exhibition brought together prewar avant-garde figures such as Kansuke Yamamoto alongside emerging postwar photographers including Kiyoji Ōtsuji, Ikkō Narahara, and Yasuhiro Ishimoto. He increasingly his attention on his beloved San'in region, in particular the Izumo area. His photos appeared in numerous photo essay books throughout the 1960s and 1970s. Curator Kaneko Ryuichi posits that these endeavors, which remain overlooked even today, confirmed Ueda's self-identification as a "lifelong amateur photographer", which he would continue to say of himself even after gaining international recognition. Yumi Kim Takenaka has argued that Ueda maintained his signature mysterious and surreal aesthetic, sometimes called Ueda-chō (Ueda-tone), in the creation of these regional images.

=== 1970s: Warabe Goyomi (Children the Year Around) and critical recognition ===
The 1971 publication of a photographic series entitled Warabe Goyomi (Children the Year Around) brought about Ueda's critical reappraisal in Japan. The series, which he had begun in 1959, primarily included pictures of children from the San'in region during the course of the four seasons. Unlike Ueda's purified sand dune compositions, Warabe Goyomi takes the viewer out of dreamland and into the daily life of the San'in region. There is a sense of social realism: the children are sometimes dirty, disheveled, unsmiling, running amok in streets and alleyways. And yet Ueda's pictures still possess an undeniable artfulness, as well as the charming playfulness of his staged sand dune images. It is impossible to tell if the children were posed, or if Ueda captured them in their element.

Some stark photographs featuring powerful black and white contrasts lead Yumi Kim Takenaka to believe that, despite Ueda's deeming himself a purely "amateur photographer", "Ueda was actually very conscious regarding the trends of the different photographic movements", notably those associated with the radical photo magazine Provoke, which presented the work of Moriyama Daidō and Nakahira Takuma, amongst others.

Ueda opened a new photography studio in 1972, Ueda Camera, in Yonago, Tottori. This three-story building included a tea parlor on the second floor and a gallery on the third. The building became a hub for local amateur photographers who created their own club, called the U Circle.

In 1975, Ueda accepted a position as a photography professor at Kyushu Sangyo University, which he held until 1994.

Ueda flew to France in 1978 to participate in the annual international photography event Les Rencontres d'Arles. From then onwards, Ueda's works were shown regularly in Europe.

=== Late career ===
Bereaved by the passing of his wife Norie in 1983, Ueda ceased taking photographs for a while. His son Mitsuru, an artistic director at the time, encouraged him to pick up the camera again. Ueda subsequently produced the series Dunes: Mode, a series of fashion photographs realized between 1983 and the mid 1990s. These graceful images, instantly recognizable as Ueda's, often feature dapper men, carefully arranged by the photographer against the familiar backdrop of the Tottori sand dunes.

Ueda also experimented with different modes of color photography, as seen in the series Shiroi Kaze (Brilliant Scenes), realized between 1980 and 1981. The images have a gauzy quality, with soft, pastel hues and a lack of sharp focus. To create this distinctive effect, Ueda employed a method that Japanese photographers had used during the Taishō era, when the pictorialist mode flourished. It involved removing the lens filter hood from a single lens of the widely-used Vest Pocket Kodak camera. Ueda wondered what images could be produced if he used this outdated method with the latest, most technologically advanced state-of-the-art color film of the time, FujiColor F-II.

Another series, entitled Genshi Yukan (Illusion), completed between 1987 and 1992, is a departure from his previous work in color photography. Ueda appears to revel in creating rich contrasts of hue, as in the case of several still lives: pomegranates and cherries are presented against an inky, seemingly infinite blue-black background.

Ueda died of a heart attack at 87 years of age on July 4, 2000.

== Legacy and collections ==
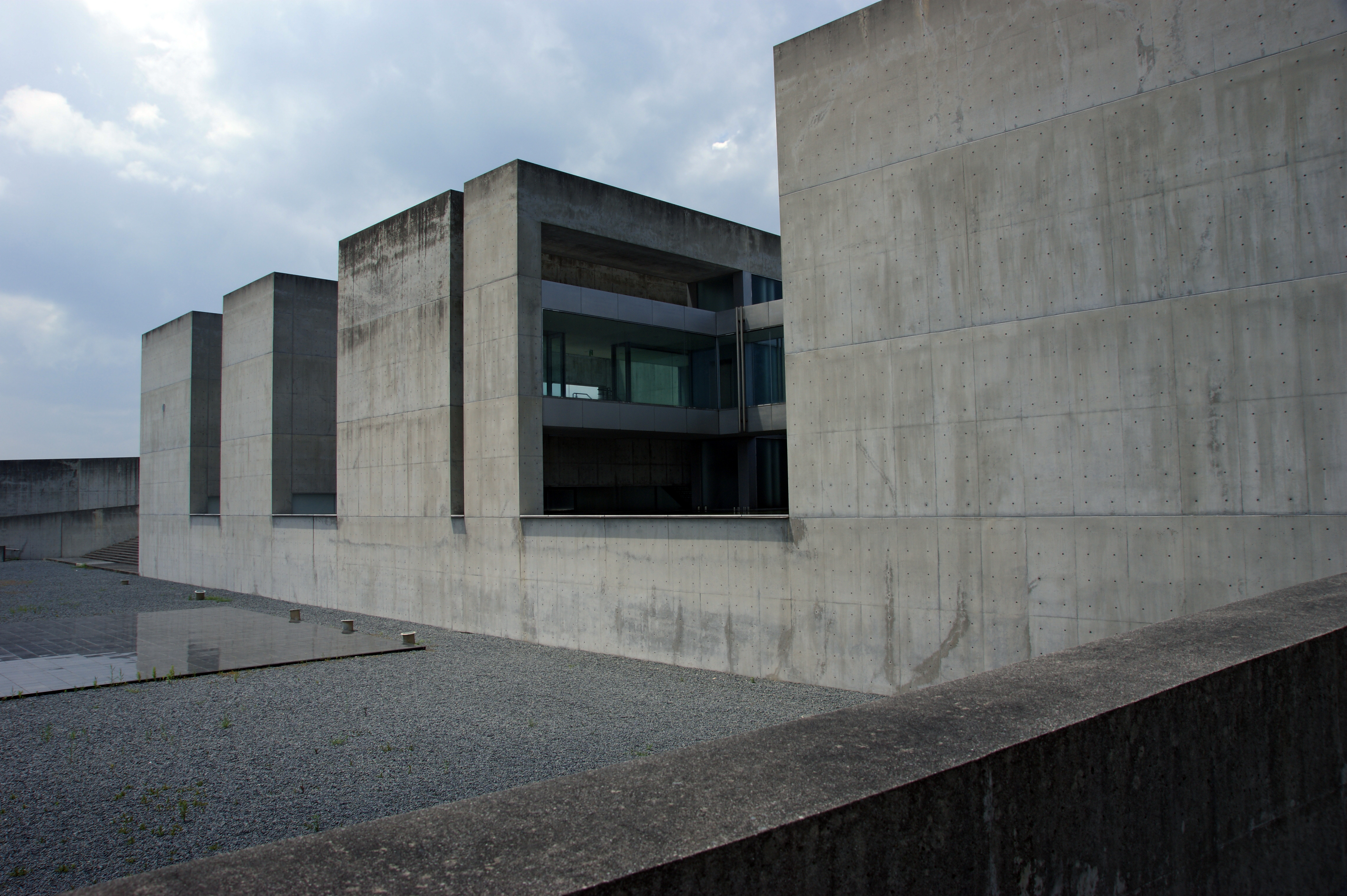
Ueda Shōji Museum of Photography

In 1995, the Ueda Shōji Museum of Photography, dedicated to exhibiting and archiving his work, opened in Kishimoto, Tottori prefecture.

The French government honored Ueda with the title of Chevalier des Arts et des Lettres in 1996. This was followed in 1998 by his receiving of the very first Tottori Prefecture Prefectural Citizen Achievement Award in 1998.

When Ueda died in 2000, he left behind a significant archive of unpublished material. Archivists have notably been working on the digitization of Ueda's color negatives retrieved at his birthplace.

In 2015, a retrospective publication was edited, featuring previously unseen works. The publishers were given access to 5000 unpublished photos.

Ueda's works have been acquired by museums in Japan and around the world, including:

- Museum of Modern Art, NY
- Kawasaki City Museum
- Yokohama Art Museum
- Tokyo Metropolitan Museum of Photography
- Yonago City Museum of Art
- Yamaguchi Prefectural Art Museum
- the National Museum of Modern Art in Tokyo
- Centre Pompidou
- Centre National des Arts Plastiques
- The Getty
- Bibliothèque Nationale de France
- Museum of Fine Arts, Houston

== Books of Ueda's works ==
- (in Japanese) Den'en no utsushikata (田園の寫し方). Ars Shashin Bunko 42. Tokyo: Ars, 1940.
- San'in no tabi (山陰の旅). Text by Shimomura Norio (下村章雄). Gendai Kyōyō Bunko. Tokyo: Shakai Shisō Kenkyūkai Shuppanbu, 1962.
- Izumo no shinwa: Kamigami no furusato: Kamera no kikō (出雲の神話：神々のふるさと カメラ紀行). Text by Ueda Masaaki (上田正昭). Tokyo: Tankō Shinsha, 1965.
- Oki: Hito to rekishi (隠岐：人と歴史). Text by Naramoto Tatsuya (奈良本辰也). Tankō Shinsha, 1967.
- Dōreki (童歴) / Children the Year Around. Eizō no Gendai 3. Tokyo: Chūōkōronsha, 1971. Black and white photographs, many but not all of which show children, arranged by season. Texts in both Japanese and English.
- Izumo jiryojō (出雲路旅情). Text by Ishizuka Takatoshi (石塚尊俊). Tokyo: Asahi Shinbunsha, 1971.
- Shinwa no tabi: Izumo, Hyūga no furusato (神話の旅：出雲・日向のふるさと). Text by Ueda Masaaki (上田正昭) et al. Nihon no Furusato Shirīzu. Tokyo: Mainichi Shinbunsha, 1973.
- Izumo (出雲). Tokyo: Mainichi Shinbunsha, 1974.
- Ueda Shōji shōryokō shashinchō: Oto no nai kioku (植田正治小旅行写真帳：音のない記憶). Tokyo: Nippon Camera, 1974.
- Izumo Taisha (出雲大社). Text by Tōno Yoshiaki (東野芳明). Heibonsha Gyararī 24. Tokyo: Heibonsha, 1974.
- Sakyū / Kodomo no shiki (砂丘・子供の四季) / Sand Dunes / Seasons of the Children. Sonorama Shashin Sensho 11. Tokyo: Asahi Sonorama, 1978. With a summary in English in addition to the Japanese text.
- Matsue: Sen kyūhyaku rokujū nen (松江：一九六〇年) / Matsue. Yonago: San'in Hōsō, 1978.
- (in Japanese) Shin Izumo fudoki (新出雲風土記) / A New Topography of Izumo. Nihon no Bi: Gendai Nihon Shashin Zenshū 5. Tokyo: Shūeisha, 1980. A large-format collection of color photographs of Izumo. Despite the additional English title (provided inconspicuously within the colophon), this book has no captions or text in English.
- Ueda Shōji besutan shashinchō: Shiroi kaze (植田正治ベス単写真帖・白い風) / Brilliant Scenes. Tokyo: Nippon Camera, 1981. ISBN 4-8179-2003-3.
- (in Japanese) Ueda Shōji (植田正治). Shōwa Shashin Zen-shigoto 10. Tokyo: Asahi Shinbunsha. 1983.
- Kidō kaiki (軌道回帰) / Shoji Ueda Polaroid 35m/m Photo Album. 3 vols. Self-published, 1986.
- Sakyū: Ueda Shōji shashinshū (砂丘：植田正治写真集) / Dunes. Tokyo: Parco, 1986. ISBN 4-89194-129-4.
- Shoji Ueda: Fotografien 1930–1986. Bremen: Forum Böttcherstrasse Bremen, Museum für Fotografie und Zeitkunst Bremen, 1987.
- Umi kaze yama iro: Shashinshū (海風山色：写真集〈中国路〉) / The view of Chugokuji. Tokyo: Gyōsei, 1990.
  - Fūdohen (風土編). ISBN 4-324-02312-3.
  - Shizenhen (自然編). ISBN 4-324-02312-3.
- Ueda Shōji sakuhinten: Sakyū gekijo (植田正治作品展：砂丘劇所). JCII Photo Salon Library 15. Tokyo: JCII Photo Salon, 1992. Catalogue of an exhibition.
- (in Japanese) Ueda Shōji no shashin (植田正治の写真) / Shoji Ueda. Tokyo: Tokyo Station Gallery, 1993. Catalogue of an exhibition held at the Tokyo Station Gallery in July–August 1993. With a very little text in English and French, but captions and much other material in Japanese only.
- Ueda Shōji shashinshū (植田正治写真集) / Shoji Ueda: Photographs. Tokyo: Takarajima-sha, 1995. ISBN 4-7966-1015-4.
- Shoji Ueda Photographs: 1930's–1990's. Kishimoto, Tottori: Shoji Ueda Museum of Photography, 1995.
- Ueda Shōji sakuhinshū (植田正治作品集). Text by Ikezawa Natsuki (池沢夏樹). Tokyo: Parco, 1995.
  - 1. (Hito) tachi ((人)たち). ISBN 4-89194-448-X.
  - 2. (Mono) tachi ((物)たち). ISBN 4-89194-449-8.
- Stone Sculpture. Text by Nakaoka Shintarō (中岡慎太郎). Tokyo BeeBooks, 1996. ISBN 4-89615-837-7.
- (in Japanese) "Oku no hosomichi" o yuku (「おくのほそ道」をゆく). Text by Kuroda Momoko (黒田杏子). Shotor Library. Tokyo: Shōgakkan, 1997. ISBN 4-09-343103-5. A lavishly illustrated retracing of the Oku no hosomichi of Matsuo Bashō.
- (in Japanese) Ueda Shōji (植田正治). Nihon no Shashinka 20. Tokyo: Iwanami Shoten, 1998. ISBN 4-00-008360-0.
- Ueda Shōji shashin no sakuhō: Amachua shokun! (植田正治・写真の作法：アマチュア諸君!). Kyoto: Kōrinsha, 1999. ISBN 4-7713-0352-5.
- Shoji Ueda. Collection l'Oiseau rare. Trezelan: Filigranes, 2000. ISBN 2-910682-72-2.
- Ueda Shōji Watakushi no shashin sakuhō (植田正治私の写真作法). Tokyo: TBS Britannica, 2000. ISBN 4-484-00217-5.
- Manazashi no kioku: Dareka no kataware de (まなざしの記憶：だれかの傍らで). Text by Washida Kiyokazu (鷲田清一). Tokyo: TBS Britannica, 2000. ISBN 4-484-00414-3.
- Masaharu Fukuyama Portraits, Shoji Ueda Photographs. Kishimoto, Tottori: Shoji Ueda Museum of Photography, 2002. Catalogue of an exhibition held July–September 2002. Two volumes.
- Une ligne subtile: Shoji Ueda, 1913–2000. Lausanne: Musée de l'Élysée; Paris: Maison européenne de la photographie, c2006. ISBN 2-88474-015-5.
- Una Línia Subtil: Shoji Ueda 1913-2000. Barcelona: Fundació la Caixa, 2005. ISBN 978-84-7664-876-6. In Catalan and English.
- Una Línea Sutil: Shoji Ueda 1913-2000. Barcelona: Fundació la Caixa, 2005. ISBN 978-84-7664-877-3. In Spanish and English.
- (in Japanese) Ueda Shōji shashinshū: Fukinukeru kaze (植田正治写真集:吹き抜ける風). Tokyo: Kyūryūdō, 2006. ISBN 4-7630-0606-1
- Ueda Shōji (植田正治) / Ueda Shoji. Hysteric 16. Tokyo: Hysteric Glamour, 2006. (Inconspicuously, Ueda Shōji "chiisai denki" (植田正治「小さい伝記」) / Ueda Shoji, "Small Biography".) A collection of Ueda's series "Small Biography" (小さい伝記, Chiisai denki), as it appeared in Camera Mainichi in the 1970s and 1980s.
- (in Japanese) Boku no arubamu (僕のアルバム) / An Album: The Everlasting Story. Tokyo: Kyūryūdō, 2007. ISBN 978-4-7630-0729-2. Despite the alternative title in English, all in Japanese. Photographs circa 1935–50, for the most part previously unpublished, and from prints newly made from Ueda's negatives. Many are of Ueda's wife.
- Ueda Shōji no sekai (植田正治の世界). Corona Books 136. Tokyo: Heibonsha, 2007. ISBN 978-4-582-63434-1.
- (in Japanese) Ueda Shōji: Chiisai denki (植田正治 小さい伝記) / Small Biography. Hankyū Komyunikēshonzu, 2007. ISBN 978-4-484-07235-7. Only in Japanese, despite the alternative title.

== Other books with works by Ueda ==
- (in Japanese) Ueda Shōji to sono nakama-tachi: 1935–55 (植田正治とその仲間たち：1935～55, Shōji Ueda and his friends, 1935–55). Yonago, Tottori: Yonago City Museum of Art, 1992. Catalogue of an exhibition held in February–March 1992 in Yonago City Museum of Art, with reproductions of many of Ueda's works.
- Suihen no kioku: San'yō San'in no shashinka-tachi: Ueda Shōji, Hayashi Tadahiko, Midorikawa Yōichi, Matsumoto Norihiko ten (水辺の記憶：山陽山陰の写真家たち「植田正治・林忠彦・緑川洋一・松本徳彦」展). Onomichi, Hiroshima: Onomichi City Museum of Art, 1999. Catalogue of an exhibition of the works of Ueda, Tadahiko Hayashi, Yōichi Midorikawa and Norihiko Matsumoto.
- Midorikawa Yōichi to yukari no shashinka-tachi 1938–59 (緑川洋一とゆかりの写真家たち1938～59). Okayama: Okayama Prefectural Museum of Art, 2005.
- Yamagishi, Shoji, ed. Japan, a Self-Portrait. New York: International Center of Photography, 1979. ISBN 0-933642-01-6 (hard), ISBN 0-933642-02-4 paper). Pages 105–110 are devoted to Ueda's work.
- Self-Portrait. Hysteric 2. Tokyo: Hysteric Glamour, 1991.
- (in Japanese) Sengo shashin / Saisei to tenkai (戦後写真・再生と展開) / Twelve Photographers in Japan, 1945–55. Yamaguchi: Yamaguchi Prefectural Museum of Art, 1990. Catalogue of an exhibition held in Yamaguchi Prefectural Museum of Art. Despite the alternative title in English, almost exclusively in Japanese (although each of the twelve has a potted chronology in English). Twenty-one of Ueda's photographs of people on the Tottori dunes appear on pp. 104–114.
- Tachihara Michizō. Ushinawareta yoru ni: Tachihara Michizō shishū (失なわれた夜に：立原道造詩集). Tokyo: Sanrio, 1975. A poetry collection by Michizō Tachihara.
