= Akasaki =

Akasaki (written: 赤崎 or 赤﨑) is a Japanese surname. Notable people with the surname include:

- Chinatsu Akasaki (赤﨑 千夏, (born 1987), Japanese actress and voice actress
- Isamu Akasaki (赤崎 勇, 1929–2021), Japanese scientist
- Katsuhisa Akasaki (born 1974), Japanese mixed martial artist
- Shuhei Akasaki (赤﨑 秀平, born 1991), Japanese footballer

== See also ==
- Akasaki, Tottori, a former town in Tottori Prefecture, Japan
- Akasaki Station (disambiguation), multiple railway stations in Japan
