= Takashi Kijima =

Japanese photographer

Takashi Kijima (杵島 隆, Kijima Takashi; 1920–2011) was a Japanese photographer best known for his photographs of nudes and of flowers.

Kijima was born in Calexico, California on 24 December 1920, the son of a Mr Watanabe, a shoe manufacturer who had immigrated in 1905, and his wife Sei (せい). The boy's name as a US citizen was Ryu Watanabe. In 1924, the Immigration Act and anti-Japanese sentiment brought the family back to Japan, where it separated: the boy's elder brother followed his father to Osaka while Takashi lived with his mother's family in Ōshinotsu (now part of Yonago), Tottori. In 1935 his father gave him a Zeiss Semi Ikonta camera, starting his interest in photography. Despite retaining US nationality at a time of anti-US sentiment, he majored in film at Nihon University, graduating in 1943. Although his elder brother was teaching Japanese to the US Navy and his father was incarcerated in a relocation camp in California (where he would become ill and die), Kijima joined the naval air corps, in a kamikaze unit.

At the end of the war, carrying the Rolleicord of one of his wartime comrades, Kijima returned to Yonago and studied photography under Shōji Ueda. Kijima became a proponent of the realist views of Ken Domon, as expressed in Camera magazine. A portrait of an old woman won effusive praise from Domon on its submission to a contest held by Camera.

Kijima moved to Tokyo in 1953, working for Light Publicity. He won prizes for his advertising work before and after becoming a freelance in 1956. His 1960 advertisements for Yawata Iron & Steel in Life won an advertising award from Life. He has been called "the most vigorous creator in the world of commercial photography in Japan" during the 1950s and early 1960s.

Since 1945, Kijima had also been following his own, noncommercial interest in photographing nudes in black and white outdoors. His photographing of nude women directly in front of Sakurada gate of the imperial palace in central Tokyo very early one morning in 1958 caused a great moral panic. His 1958 exhibition, titled "Ra" (裸), of nude photographs was the second held in Japan (the first was by Kira Sugiyama); more than thirty thousand people came to see it.

At some time in the late 1950s Kijima and Shōzō Kitadai did the photography for an untitled set, designed by Kitadai, of four miniature books (mamebon) of photographs, distributed by Graphic Shūdan (グラフィック集団, Gurafikku Shūdan); its effective use of juxtapositions and miniature format has elevated it to fame among the Japanese photobooks of the time.

Kijima gradually turned toward photographing traditional Japanese arts and nature and particularly flowers, with entire books about cherry blossoms and orchids. He specialized in kimono and until very late in his life was photographing models for the magazine Kimono Salon.

Ikui has described Kijima's works as influenced by both Domon and the very different Ueda, but finding a third, commercial way.

Kijima died on 20 February 2011.

== Books of Kijima's works ==
- With Shōzō Kitadai. Untitled set of four miniature books (each titled by number alone). [Tokyo]: Graphic Shūdan, late 1950s.
- Kyō no Kankoku: 38dosen no kochira-gawa (今日の韓国：38度線のこちら側). 1970.
- Ran (蘭). Tokyo: Kōdansha, 1975.
- The Orchid. London: Octopus, 1978. ISBN 0-7064-0808-X.
- Zauber der Orchideen. 1980.
- Yoshitsune Senbonzakura (義経千本桜) / Keys to the Japanese Mind: Yoshitsune senbonzakura. 4 vols. Tokyo: NHK, 1981. ISBN 4-14-009070-7.
  - 1. Ukiyoe (浮世絵).
  - 2. Kabuki: jō (歌舞伎 上).
  - 3. Kabuki: ge (歌舞伎 下).
  - 4. Bunraku (文楽).
- L'Orchidea. 1983.
- (With Ichikawa Kumiko) Ran (欄). Bunka Shuppankyoku, 1987.
- Ran (欄). Graphic-sha, 1988.
- (With Ichikawa Kumiko) Ribon to ran (リボンと欄). 1989.
- Ran-Hyakkafu (蘭=百花譜) / The Original Orchids. Tokyo: Shōgakukan, 1987. ISBN 4-09-699331-X. 2nd ed. Tokyo: Shōgakukan, 1990. ISBN 4-09-680511-4.
- Ran (蘭) / The Orchid. Tokyo: Gurafikku-sha, 1988. ISBN 4-7661-0453-6. With text in Japanese and English.
- Orchids: Wonders of Nature. London: Salamander, 1988. ISBN 0-86101-422-7. New York: Mallard, 1989. ISBN 0-7924-5065-5.
- Orchidées: Démons et merveilles. Solar, 1988. ISBN 2-263-01290-7. France Loisirs, 1989. ISBN 2-7242-4428-1.
- Orchidee Colori Suggestioni Fascino di un Magico Fiore. Mondadori, 1988. ISBN 88-374-1020-4.
- Orchideen. Wunder der Natur. München, Südwest, 1988. ISBN 3-517-01097-9.
- Shiki: Shinjuku Gyōen (四季：新宿御苑). Tokyo: Kōdansha, 1991. ISBN 4-06-205088-9. With text in Japanese and English.
- Sakura no shiki (桜の四季). Tokyo: Shōgakukan, 1991. ISBN 4-09-680512-2.
- Orquideas. Madrid: Anaya, 1994. ISBN 84-207-3493-4.
- Sotsugyō omedetou (卒業おめでとう). Parco Greeting Books. Tokyo: Parco, 1994. ISBN 4-89194-364-5.
- Razō densetsu 1945–1960 (裸像伝説 1945～1960) / Legend of the Nude, 1945–1960. Tokyo: Shoenshinsha, 1998. ISBN 4-915125-88-2. With texts in Japanese and English.
- (in Japanese) Kijima Takashi ten (杵島隆展) / Takashi Kijima. Yonago, Tottori: Yonago City Museum of Art, 2001. Catalogue of a major exhibition held at Yonago City Museum of Art, contains photographs from Kijima's career as well as much reference material.

== Other books showing Kijima's works ==
- (in Japanese) Ueda Shōji to sono nakama-tachi: 1935–55 (植田正治とその仲間たち：1935～55, Shōji Ueda and his friends, 1935–55). Yonago, Tottori: Yonago City Museum of Art, 1992. Catalogue of an exhibition held at the Yonago City Museum of Art in February–March 1992, with reproductions of Kijima's works on pp. 99–110.
