= Sakae Tamura (photographer) =

Japanese portrait and miscellaneous photographer

Tamura's photograph Shiroi hana ("White flower") on the cover of the Tokyo Metropolitan Museum of Photography's "The Founding and Development of Modern Photography in Japan" exhibition catalogue, in 1995

Sakae Tamura (September 17, 1906 – July 22, 1987) was a Japanese photographer and a prominent figure in the New Photography movement in the years before the war.

Born in Ōtsu, Shiga Prefecture, Tamura graduated from the Tokyo College of Photography (now Tokyo Polytechnic University) and entered Oriental Photo Industrial in 1928 and became editor of Photo Times. He was an active contributor to the magazine Geijutsu Shashin Kenkyū and in Japan Photography Association (日本光画協会, Nihon Kōga Kyōkai), created in 1928 and a successor to the Japan Photographic Art Association (日本光画芸術協会, Nihon Kōga Geijutsu Kyōkai). He was a leading figure in the New Photography Research Society (新興写真研究会, Shinkō Shashin Kenkyūkai), formed in 1930.

Tamura's work was influenced both by pictorialism and by New Photography.

Tamura is particularly known for his portraits, and Shiroi hana (白い花, White flower, 1931) is the best-known of these and widely anthologized. Okatsuka says that it expresses a certain lyricism but “displays a more sophisticated sense of maturity” than the works of his contemporaries Masataka Takayama and Jun Watanabe.

== Books by Tamura ==
- Seibutsu shashin no utsushikata (静物写真の写し方). Tokyo: Sōgeisha, 1952. A guide to photographing still lifes.
- Sakuga no daiippo (作画の第一歩). Tokyo: Genkōsha, 1954. A guide to the practice of photography.

== Sources ==
- Kaneko Ryūichi. “The Origins and Development of Japanese Art Photography.” Pp. 100–42 of Tucker, ed., History. Pp. 110–13, 137. (in English)
- Matsuda Takako. “Tamura Sakae”. In Tucker, ed., History, p. 363. (in English)
- Matsumoto Norihiko. (松本徳彦), ed. A Collection of Japanese Photographs 1912–1940. Tokyo: Shashinkosha, 1990. (in Japanese) Despite its English-only title, the book is in Japanese only. It is a lavish production (if unpaginated), not offered for sale and instead presumably distributed to customers.
- Nihon kindai shashin no seiritsu to tenkai (日本近代写真の成立と展開) / The Founding and Development of Modern Photography in Japan. Tokyo: Tokyo Museum of Photography, 1995. (in English and Japanese)
- Nihon no shashinka (日本の写真家) / Biographic Dictionary of Japanese Photography. Tokyo: Nichigai Associates, 2005. ISBN 4-8169-1948-1. (in Japanese) Despite the English-language alternative title, all in Japanese.
- Taidan: Shashin kono gojūnen (対談：写真この五十年, Discussions: The last fifty years of photography). Edited by the staff of Asahi Camera. Tokyo: Asahi Shinbunsha, 1974. (in Japanese) Ihei Kimura interviews Tamura in chapter 7, "Shinkō shashin tezukuri no aji" (新興写真手作りの味).
- Tucker, Anne Wilkes, et al. The History of Japanese Photography. New Haven: Yale University Press, 2003. ISBN 0-300-09925-8. (in English)
