= Shin Yanagisawa =

Japanese photographer

Shin Yanagisawa (柳沢 信, Yanagisawa Shin; 1936-2008) was a Japanese photographer.

== See also ==
- Tokyo Polytechnic University
- Camera Mainichi
- Asahi Camera
