= Tōhaku, Tottori =

Dissolved municipality in Tottori prefecture, Japan

Tōhaku (東伯町, Tōhoku-chō) was a town located in Tōhaku District, Tottori Prefecture, Japan.

As of 2003, the town had an estimated population of 11,894 and a density of 144.70 persons per km^{2}. The total area was 82.20 km^{2}.

On September 1, 2004, Tōhaku, along with the town of Akasaki (also from Tōhaku District), was merged to create the town of Kotoura.
