= Akasaki Station =

Akasaki Station is the name of two train stations in Japan:

- Akasaki Station (Iwate); see List of railway stations in Japan: A
- Akasaki Station (Tottori)
