= Yonago City Museum of Art =

Art museum in Japan

Coordinates: 35°25′43.4″N 133°19′51.9″E

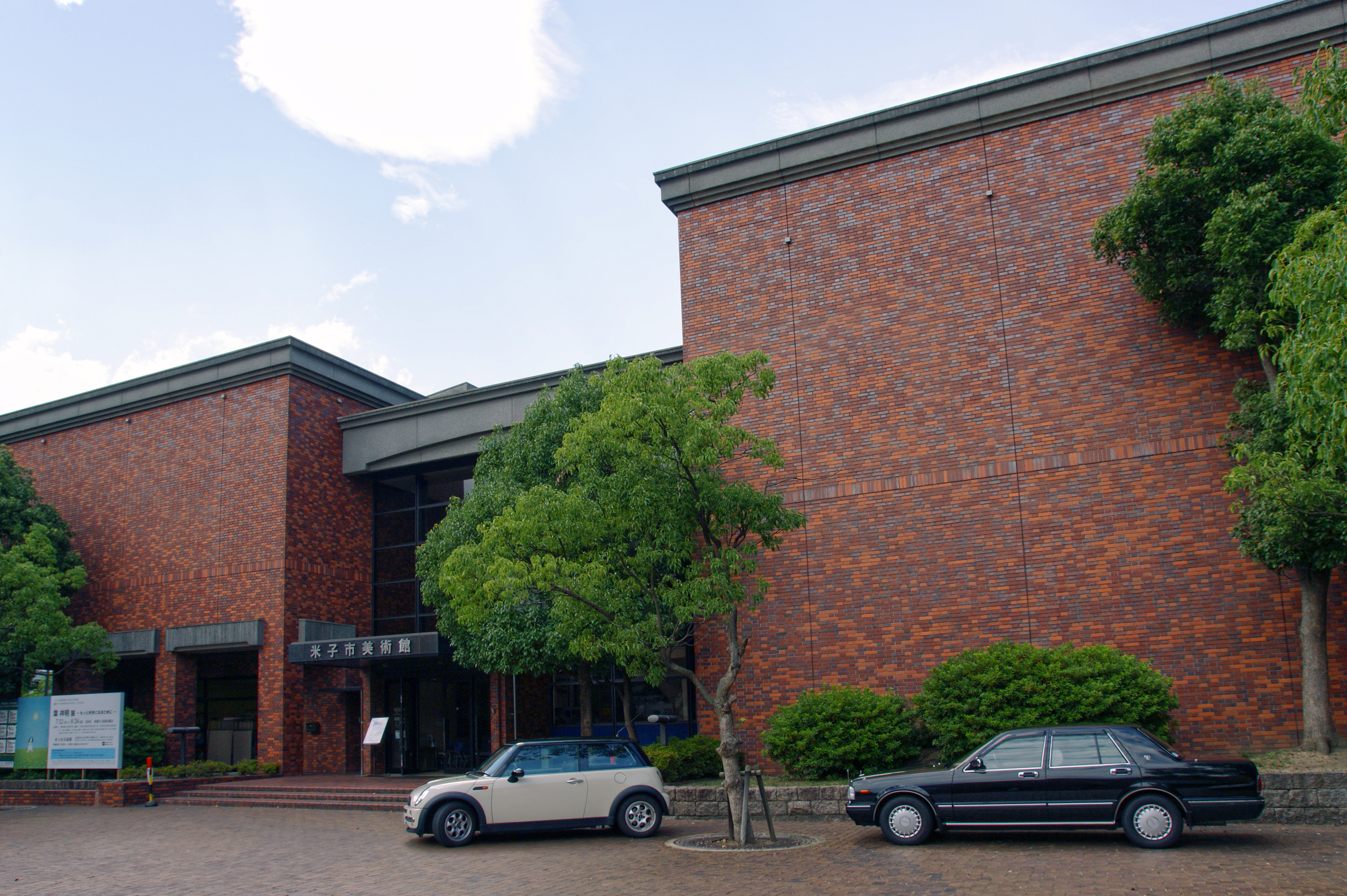
Yonago City Museum of Art

Yonago City Museum of Art (米子市美術館, Yonago-shi Bijutsukan) is a municipal art gallery in Yonago, Tottori Prefecture (Japan) that opened in 1983.

The gallery has a permanent collection of paintings and photographs; the latter is particularly strong for the photographers Teikō Shiotani and Shōji Ueda. It also hosts special exhibitions.

The museum is at Nakamachi 12, Yonago-shi.
