= Takamasa Inamura =

Japanese photographer

Takamasa Inamura (稲村 隆正, Inamura Takamasa; 1923–1989) was a renowned Japanese photographer.
