= Shunji Ōkura =

Japanese photographer (1937–2015)

- Born: 2 May 1937; Ushigome, Tokyo, Japan
- Died: February 6, 2015 (aged 77); Japan
- Occupation: Photographer
- Years active: 1960s–2010s
- Notable work: Emma (1971)

Shunji Ōkura (2 May 1937 – 6 February 2015) was a Japanese photographer.

== Biography ==
He was the grandson of painter Gyokudō Kawai. In 1958 he became Akira Satō's assistant and since 1959 he worked as a freelance photographer.

Ōkura's Emma photobook, published in 1971, a candid story-portrait of his friend and muse, Japanese actress and singer Emma Sugimoto, was awarded the Japan Photograph Association's annual prize.

Ōkura died on 6 February 2025, at the age of 77.

== Books ==
- Emma, private 2. Tokyo: Camera Mainichi, 1971
- Muses, Tokyo: Seibundo Shinkosha, 1992
- Kabuki today, text by Iwao Kamimura. Tokyo, 2001
