= Camera (Japanese magazine) =

Japanese photography magazine

Camera (カメラ, Kamera), or Ars Camera Arsカメラ, Arusu Kamera), was one of the older and longer running of Japanese camera magazines. It was published by the company Ars.

== History and profile ==
The first issue of Ars Camera is dated April 1921: predating Asahi Camera by five years. With a mixture of photographs, material about cameras, and contests, it set a pattern for mainstream camera magazines that has continued to the present day. It managed to keep publishing despite the Tokyo earthquake of 1923, but from January 1941 was forced to merge with Shashin Salon 写真サロン, Shashin Saron) and Camera Club (カメラ倶楽部, Kamera Kurabu) to form Shashin Bunka (写真文化).

Camera was quick to reemerge after the war, with an issue dated January 1946. For some years it was edited by Kineo Kuwabara. Its last issue was dated August 1956.
