= Akasaki, Tottori =

Dissolved municipality in Tottori prefecture, Japan

Coordinates: 35°30′49.25″N 133°38′5.45″E

Akasaki (赤碕町, Akasaki-chō) was a town located in Tōhaku District, Tottori Prefecture, Japan.

As of 2003, the town had an estimated population of 8,101 and a density of 140.40 persons per km^{2}. The total area was 57.70 km^{2}.

On September 1, 2004, Akasaki was merged with the town of Tōhaku, also from Tōhaku District, to create the town of Kotoura.

== See also ==
- Akasaki Railway Station
