= Nippon Camera =

Japanese photography magazine

Nippon Camera (日本カメラ, Nippon kamera) is a Japanese photography magazine, published between 1950 and 2021.

Nippon Camera started in March 1950 as a bimonthly magazine, published by Kōgeisha (Tokyo) as the successor to the book series Amachua Shashin Sōsho (1948–49). It became a monthly magazine from July 1951.

The magazine is now (2020) published (in Tokyo) by Nippon Camera-sha, which has also published an annual, Shashin Nenkan (写真年鑑) and other photography-related books.

Since the demise of Camera Mainichi, the sole rival of Nippon Camera as a photography magazine attempting to cater to all interests was Asahi Camera, but this too was discontinued in summer 2020.

In April 2021 the magazine announced that it will suspend its publication after the May 2021 issue.
