= Masataka Takayama (photographer) =

Japanese photographer

Masataka Takayama (高山 正隆, Takayama Masataka; 15 May 1895 - 14 April 1981) was one of the most prominent Japanese photographers in the first half of the twentieth century.

== Career ==
Takayama was born in Tokyo, Japan. As an amateur photographer, he published many of his works in the magazine Geijutsu Shashin Kenkyū (芸術写真研究), beginning in the 1920s. He remained an active photographer even after World War II.

He was talented at pictorialist (art) photography and took many photographs using a soft focus lens and deformation and "wipe-out" techniques.

Takayama usually used a Vest Pocket Kodak camera manufactured by Eastman Kodak camera, which was a very compact folding model taking 127 film equipped with a single-element lens (単玉, tangyoku). (Note: Although referred to as a single-element lens, the lens fitted to the most basic models of the Vest Pocket Kodak is a cemented doublet meniscus lens. This lens was fitted with a dish-shaped lens hood that reduced the aperture to f/11; when the hood was removed, the lens had a pleasant soft focus effect caused by uncorrected spherical aberration.) These cameras and Japanese derivatives such as the Rokuoh-sha Pearlette and Minolta Vest) were popular in Japan at the time for snapshot use, which were called vestan (ベス単, besutan) cameras as a portmanteau: "ves" was taken from "vest" and "tan" from tangyoku. Takayama's works are thus said to belong to the "ves-tan" (besutan) school.
