= Kineo Kuwabara =

Japanese photographer

Tōkyō Shitamachi 1930, a 2006 anthology of Kuwabara's earlier work in the shitamachi (lower town) of Tokyo.

Kineo Kuwabara (桑原 甲子雄, Kuwabara Kineo; December 1913 – December 10, 2007) was a Japanese editor and photographer, known for photographing Tokyo for over half a century.

Kuwabara was born in Tokyo in 1913. He started taking photographs around 1931 with a Vest Pocket Kodak, but his interest increased as a result of an invitation by his neighbor Hiroshi Hamaya to go to a photo-shoot in Kamakura. His photograph, taken with a Leica C, won second prize in the related contest, leading him to submit his work to photographic magazines, which accepted them.

In 1940, he went to Manchuria to take photographs for military purposes.

He returned after the war and became editor of the magazine Camera and thereafter edited other photographic magazines, putting the nurture of new talent and photographic criticism ahead of his own photography.

Kuwabara's own photographs received more critical attention from the late 1960s, but the revival in his work only took off in the mid-1970s. (Note: As late as 1973 he was not profiled within (in Japanese) Shashinka hyakunin: Kao to shashin (写真家100人：顔と写真, 100 photographers: Profiles and photographs), a 20th-anniversary special publication of Camera Mainichi magazine (Tokyo).) He came to be regarded as one of the foremost street photographers, particularly among those active before the war. While his earlier photographs of Tokyo had concentrated on Asakusa and elsewhere in the Shitamachi (area traditionally populated by artisans), his later photographs (many in color) show Setagaya-ku, where he later lived.

Nobuyoshi Araki did much to promote the revival of interest in Kuwabara's works, and the pair had a joint exhibition, "Love you Tokyo", in the Setagaya Art Museum in summer 1993.

Kuwabara died on 10 December 2007, a fact that was only announced in February 2008.

== Books of Kuwabara's photographs ==
- (in Japanese) Tōkyō Shōwa jūichinen (東京昭和十一年, Tokyo 1936). Tokyo: Shōbunsha, 1974. Photographs taken 1935–9 (and for the most part 1936–7) in Tokyo — particularly Shitaya-ku and Asakusa-ku — and nearby places such as Kamakura. Texts and captions in Japanese only.
- (in Japanese) Manshū Shōwa jūgonen (満州昭和十五年, Manchuria 1940). Tokyo: Shōbunsha, 1974.
- Watakushi no shashinshi (私の写真史). Tokyo: Shōbunsha, 1976.
- Yume no machi: Kuwabara Kineo Tōkyō shashinshū 夢の町：桑原甲子雄東京写真集). Tokyo: Shōbunsha, 1977.
- Tōkyō chōjitsu: Kuwabara Kineo shashinshū (東京長日：桑原甲子雄写真集) / Tokyo Days. Sonorama Shashin Sensho 15. Tokyo: Asahi Sonorama, 1978. Photographs of Tokyo, with an emphasis on the 1970s. With a summary in English as well as Japanese.
- Tōkyō 1934–1993 (東京1934〜1993). Tokyo: Shinchōsha, 1995. Edited by Kazuo Nishii. There are 736 photographs, many of them two to a (rather small) page. The paper and printing quality are not of art-book quality; nevertheless, this book scores on sheer quantity. Short captions in English, longer captions and other texts in Japanese only.
- Kuwabara Kineo shashinten: Tōkyō Shōwa modan(桑原甲子雄写真展：東京昭和モダン). Tokyo: Higashi Nihon Tetsudō Bunka Zaidan, 1995.
- (in Japanese) Kuwabara Kineo (桑原甲子雄, Kineo Kuwabara). Nihon no Shashinka 19. Tokyo: Iwanami, 1998. ISBN 4-00-008359-7. Photographs 1934–97. Captions and text in Japanese only.
- (in Japanese) Kuwabara Kineo: Raika to Tōkyō: Raika sutōrī bukku (桑原甲子雄：ライカと東京：ライカ・ストーリー・ブック) / Kineo Kuwabara: Tokyo through a Leica. Issue no. 60 (2001) of Kamera Rebyū: Kurashikku Kamera Senka (カメラレビュー：クラシックカメラ専科). ISBN 4-257-13036-9. Most of this issue of this lavishly produced quarterly is devoted to Kuwabara's works. Despite the alternative English title, the text is in Japanese only.
- (in Japanese) Tōkyō Shitamachi 1930 (東京下町1930, Downtown Tokyo 1930). Tokyo: Kawade Shobō, 2006. ISBN 4-309-26929-X.
- Rabu yū Tōkyō (ラブ・ユー・トーキョー). Tokyo: Setagaya Art Museum, 1993. Catalogue of an exhibition held with Nobuyoshi Araki at the Setagaya Art Museum.
- Kineo Kuwabara's Photographs: Tokyo Sketches of 60 Years. Selected Works from the Collection of Setagaya Art Museum. Tokyo: Setagaya Art Museum, 2014. Edited by Miki Tsukada and Naohiro Takahashi. Captions and other texts by Tadayasu Sakai and Tsukada in Japanese and English, translated by Louisa Rubinfien.

== Other books with photographs by Kuwabara ==
- Modan Tōkyō rapusodi (モダン東京狂詩曲展) / Rhapsody of Modern Tokyo. Tokyo: Tokyo Metropolitan Museum of Photography, 1993. Catalogue of an exhibition held in 1993 of photographs of Tokyo from the 1930s at the Tokyo Metropolitan Museum of Photography. Pages 60–85 are devoted to Kuwabara's works. (The other photographers whose works are shown are Hiroshi Hamaya, Kōji Morooka, and Kōroku Ōkubo; and, in appendices, Masao Horino and Yoshio Watanabe.)

== Exhibition ==
- Kineo Kuwabara’s Photographs: Tokyo Sketches of 60 Years, Setagaya Art Museum, Tokyo, April-June 2014. 200 photographs from throughout his career, from the collection of the Setagaya Art Museum.
