= Asahi Camera =

Japanese photography magazine

Asahi Camera (アサヒカメラ, Asahi kamera) was a Japanese monthly photographic magazine, published from April 1926 until July 2020, when publication was suspended because of a sharp fall in advertising spending during the COVID-19 pandemic.

== History and profile ==
The first issue was that for April 1926. It was from the outset published by Asahi Shimbun-sha, publisher of the newspaper The Asahi Shimbun. The headquarters was in Tokyo.

From the January 1941 issue, it merged with the magazines Geijutsu Shashin Kenkyū (芸術写真研究, "Technique Photograph Studies") and Shōzō Shashin Kenkyū (肖像写真研究, "Portrait Photograph Studies"). Publication was suspended with the April 1942 issue.

Publication resumed after the Second World War with the October 1949 issue. Its cover employed a monochrome portrait of a girl by Ihei Kimura, who would become a major contributor.

For much of the period 1962–85, the job of photographing the cover was given to a single photographer for four or more consecutive months.
Year	Months	Photographer
1962	Jan–Dec	Kichisaburō Anzai
1963	Jan–Dec	Masaaki Imamura
1964	Jan–Apr	Noriaki Yokosuka
1964	May–Aug	Naoya Sugiki
1964	Sep–Dec	Hiroki Hayashi
1965	Jan–Apr	Hideki Fujii
1965	May–Aug	Hiroshi Nagaoka
1965	Sep–Dec	Toshio Tateishi
1966	Jan–Apr	Masaaki Nishimiya
1966	May–Aug	Shigeji Asano
1966	Sep–Dec	Kazumi Kurigami
1967–8	not applicable	
1969	Jan–Dec	Kazumi Kurigami
1970	Jan–Dec	Daidō Moriyama
1971	Jan–Dec	Umihiko Konishi
1972	Jan–Dec	Kishin Shinoyama
1973	Jan–Dec	Yutaka Takanashi
1974	Jan–Dec	Akira Satō
1975	Jan–Dec	Hajime Sawatari
1976	Jan–Dec	Shin Yanagisawa
1977	Jan–Dec	Shunji Ōkura
1978	not applicable	
1979	Jan–Dec	Akira Satō
1980	Jan–Dec	Takamasa Inamura
1981	Jan–Dec	Kōichi Inakoshi
1982	Jan–Jun	Bishin Jūmonji
1982	Jul–Dec	Noriaki Yokosuka
1983	Jan–Dec	Hajime Sawatari
1984	not applicable	
1985	Jan–Dec	Hajime Sawatari

Asahi Camera attempted to satisfy interests in all areas of photography, with short portfolios in monochrome and color by established and new photographers (most but not all of them Japanese), contests for readers, articles about technique, and (accounting for much of the magazine's bulk) news and tests of equipment. The April 2006 issue, for example, had over four hundred pages (many of them advertising, but the great majority editorial) with five or more pages devoted to work by each of ten photographers, the announcement of the latest Kimura Ihei Award, articles about equipment (new, old and even future), contests, and much else.

Even if one considers only its uninterrupted years of publication, from 1949, Asahi Camera was the oldest surviving Japanese photography magazine. Like any magazine that attempts to satisfy people with very different interests, it was sometimes criticized for not serving any of them particularly well, but its equipment reviews appeared to be as rigorous as any and it continued to attract some of the best photographers for its portfolios. Like many photographic magazines, many of its covers somehow happened to show conventionally attractive young women (sometimes nude), and the overall impression it gave was unadventurous, but daring was a rare commodity in the Japanese magazine market and Asahi Camera did display work that cannot be regarded as at all commercial.

Since the demise of Camera Mainichi in 1985, the only rival as a magazine attempting to cater for all photographic interests became Nippon Camera.

From its 1926 start until around 1932, in addition to the katakana title, the magazine was prominently titled in English, Asahi Camera: The Japanese Journal of Photography. A shortened version, Asahi Camera, continued as an alternative title until late in the twentieth century but then was written "ASAHICAMERA".

== Internationally ==
Asahi Camera was also published in the US around the late 2000s. It was possibly retired in 2020.
