= Photographic Society of Japan awards =

Since its inception, the Photographic Society of Japan has annually presented a large number of awards.

== Awards ==
=== 1952–1956 ===
Year	Winners
1952	Kiyoshi Esaki, Yasuji Kamata, Reisen Narusawa, 大村斎, 杉浦千之助
1953	[none]
1954	Haruki Egashira, Hideo Kaneda, Shigene Kanemaru, Ihei Kimura, Tetsuo Kitahara, Norizō Miki, Kokki Miyake, Yōnosuke Natori, Kiyoshi Nishiyama, Yasuzō Nojima, Terutarō Ogata, Kōyō Okada, Seisuke Sakuma, Shōzaburō Sugimoto, Shinjirō Takahashi, Katsuo Takakuwa, Usaku Tōjō, Kōji Tsukamoto, Keikichi Yamabe
1955	Chūzō Aochi, Toragorō Ariga, Ken Domon, Katsuji Fukuda, Yoshichi Igarashi, Hakudō Konishi, Seiichi Mamiya, Michio Miyata, Hidenobu Sakaki, Shōgyoku Yamahata, Hayao Yoshikawa, Shinnosuke Yūki, 石井盛之輔, 谷口徳次郎
1956	[none]

=== 1957–1984 ===
Year	Distinguished Contributions	Annual	Newcomer's
1957	AJAPS	Kinsuke Shimada, Yoshio Watanabe, Takayoshi Yoda	[none]
1958	Hiromu Hara, Nobuo Ina, Tōkyō Shashin Kenkyūkai	Hiroshi Hamaya	Yoshinobu Nakamura, Keisō Tomioka, 渡辺直輝
1959	Shin Fujisawa, Ryūsuke Nishimura	Hiroshi Kubota	Kenji Ishiguro, Keisuke Kojima
1960	Gesshū Ogawa	Ken Domon	[none]
1961	Edward Steichen, 宇田川庫吉	Tokutarō Tanaka	北沢勉
1962	Shinnosuke Fukushima	Jun Miki	Tatsuo Kurihara
1963	Kazuo Hayashi	Takeji Iwamiya, Yōichi Midorikawa	Noriaki Yokosuka
1964	Niryū Nagata, Bizan Ueda	Photography department of the publishing arm of Asahi Shimbun	Kōjō Tanaka, 中島洋
1965	Sakae Haruki, Eiichi Sakurai, Tsutomu Watanabe, Tomizō Yoshikawa Kōgaku Kōgyō Gijutsu Kenkyū Kumiai	Shihachi Fujimoto, Akihiko Okamura	Kichisaburō Anzai, Shinzō Hanabusa
1966	Taikichi Irie, Kōyō Kageyama, Jun Koana, Shisui Tanahashi, 高田正雄	[none]	Yasuo Ishigame
1967	Masao Nagaoka, Nihon Hōdō Shashin Renmei	[none]	Masayuki Aramaki, Keizō Kaneko
1968	小安正直	Kiyoshi Sonobe, Ishikawa-ken Shashinshi-kai	川仁忍
1969	Shin'ichi Kikuchi	JPS, Kenzō Nakajima	Hiroki Mori
1970	Yoshio Watanabe	Kishin Shinoyama, Yoshikazu Shirakawa	上井幸子
1971	Hachirō Suzuki, Kōgorō Yamada	Tadahiko Hayashi, Shisei Kuwabara, Banri Namikawa, Kōjō Tanaka	Akira Kinoshita
1972	岡田正夫, Mikio Tamura	Kon Sasaki, Bukō Shimizu, Hisaji Taga	Kazuo Kitai
1973	Fusao Hori	Bun'yō Ishikawa, Kōji Morooka, Hajime Sawatari	Yoshirō Koseki, Teruhiko Sakaki
1974	川口盛成	Keiichirō Gotō, Yoshihiko Shiga, Yūkichi Watabe	Shōkō Hashimoto, Kiyoshi Takai
1975	Tarō Hiramatsu	Kineo Kuwabara, Takeyoshi Tanuma, Shōmei Tōmatsu, Takuya Tsukahara, Shōji Ueda	Kunio Yamamura
1976	Tōyō Miyatake, Kōyō Shibazaki	JPS, Rekishi-teki Kamera Shinsa Iinkai of Japan Camera and Optical Instruments Inspection and Testing Institute, Takashi Kijima	Shin'ya Fujiwara, Issei Suda
1977	Gorō Miyamoto, Eiko Yamazawa, 工藤清	Kenkyū Hattatsu Gurūpu of Fujifilm, Shirō Shirahata	Tsuneo Enari, Bishin Jumonji
1978	Setsuzō Katayama, Kōtarō Tanaka	Hisae Imai, Yasuhiro Ishimoto, Yoshikazu Minami	Taku Aramasa, Shigeo Gochō, Satoshi Kuribayashi
1979	疋田晴久	Tadahiko Hayashi, APA, Hiroshi Kawashima	Kōji Hashimoto, Kazuyoshi Nomachi
1980	児島寛治, Masao Tanaka	Jun Morinaga, Haruo Tomiyama, 米谷美久	Sanjirō Minamikawa, Tadashi Shimada
1981	Hatsutarō Horiuchi, Masaya Kaifu, 貫井提吉	Hiroji Kubota, Banri Namikawa, Takashi Okamura, Yoshikazu Shirakawa	Keizō Kitajima, Yasuo Sakuma
1982	Naratoshi Furukawa, Akira Sasai, Shigeru Tamura	Akio Nakamura, Yoshino Ōishi	Manabu Miyazaki, Masaaki Nakagawa, Shigemoto Nobi
1983	Teikō Shiotani, Yukio Tabuchi, 奥平武男	Daidō Moriyama, Akihisa Masuda, Issei Suda	Hiromi Nagakura, Kiyoshi Suzuki, Hiroshi Yamazaki
1984	Kōnosuke Ishii, Kinsuke Shimada	古澤和子, Shinzō Maeda, Teruhiro Sakaki, Yutaka Takanashi, Hiromi Tsuchida	Keiichi Tahara, Akihide Tamura

=== 1985–1993 ===
Year	International	Distinguished Contributions	Annual	Newcomer's
1985	George Eastman House, Furansu Shashin Kyōkai	Katsuji Fukuda, Kametarō Kawasaki, Tetsuo Yano	ミノルタカメラ発達グループ, Hideki Fujii, Tokumitsu Iwagō, Shōji Hanasawa, Takeshi Nishikawa	Hiroshi Ōsaka, Hitoshi Tsukiji
1986	[none]	Kanbee Hanaya, Sakae Tamura, 松本福太郎, 木村迪夫	Sanjirō Minamikawa, Masatoshi Naitō, Ikkō Narahara, Tadashi Shimada	Toshio Arai, Kōzō Miyoshi, Shintarō Suda
1987	オランダ国立ライデン大学写真絵画博物館	Japan Camera and Optical Instruments Inspection and Testing Institute, Takeshi Kamei, 高野仁太郎, 夏目正衛	Kōtarō Iizawa, Shunji Ōkura, Hidenobu Ueno	Tetsu Iida, Norio Kobayashi, Gen Yamaguchi
1988	郎静山	Hiroshi Hamaya, Tadahiko Kobayashi, Masami Nakai	Takashi Hamaguchi, Jun Miki, Kōichi Saitō, Takeyoshi Tanuma	Hiroh Kikai
1989	[none]	Ken Domon Museum of Photography, 大庭成一, Kōrō Honjō, Tetsuo Kishi, Shōji Ueda	Takeji Iwamiya, Yoshino Ōishi, Kiyoshi Sonobe, Yūkichi Watabe	Mitsuo Gotōda, Masato Seto, Tsuyoshi Takahashi
1990	[none]	Shōtarō Akiyama, Motoichi Kumagai, Jun Miki, Takeshi Ozawa	Nobuyoshi Araki, Hiromi Eguchi, Yasuhiro Ishimoto, Kazuyoshi Nomachi	Mitsuyoshi Sekido, Nobuo Shimose, 神蔵美子
1991	David Douglas Duncan	Kiichi Asano, Higashikawa (Hokkaidō), Kineo Kuwabara, Fumio Matsuda, 後藤江陽	Takeshi Mizukoshi, Shigeichi Nagano	竹上正明
1992	[none]	Yasuhiro Ishimoto, Rikkō Nakamura, Shōji Ōtake, 坂本樹勇	小西祐典, Jōji Hashiguchi, Seiji Kurata, Satoshi Kuribayashi	Ryōichi Saitō, Toshio Yamane, Kōji Yoshioka
1993	[none]	中崎昌雄	Fusako Kodama, Yasuo Higa, Yutaka Takanashi, Chōtoku Tanaka	Yōichi Kamiyama, Naruaki Ōnishi

=== 1994–2003 ===
Year	International	Distinguished Contributions	Cultural Advancement	Annual	Newcomer's	special
1994	ジェームス L エンヤート	San'ya Nakamori, Masaya Nakamura, Kakugorō Saeki	[none]	Eikoh Hosoe, Takeyoshi Tanuma, Kazuo Unno	Shōzō Maruta, Yutaka Senoo	[none]
1995	Cornell Capa	Masahide Amano, Kōjō Tanaka, 玉田顕一郎 (posthumous)	Haruo Tomiyama, Art and Natural History Museum of Sado, Photo Symposium in 沖縄実行委員会	Shigeichi Nagano, Manabu Miyazaki, Seiichi Motohashi	小西淳也, 楢木逸郎	[none]
1996	[none]	Shihachi Fujimoto, Kiyoji Ōtsuji, Yoshio Takemura	Tokuyama City Cultural Promotion Foundation, Japan Culture Association	Taku Aramasa, Shunji Dodo, Kikuji Kawada	Katsumi Sunamori, Hideo Suzuki	JPS
1997	John Szarkowski	Hideo Haga, Hichirō Ouchi	Ashiya Museum of Art and History を, 中心としたボランティア活動グループ	Yoshihiro Tatsuki, Kazuyoshi Nomachi	Osamu Kanemura, Kisei Kobayashi	[none]
1998	Jean-Luc Monterosso	Shūichi Sakai, Akira Tanno	Yukio Tabuchi Memorial Museum, Kazama Kōji	Akira Satō, Katsumi Watanabe	Bon Ishikawa, Asako Narahashi	[none]
1999	L. Fritz Gruber	Yōichi Midorikawa, Noriyoshi Sawamoto (posthumous), Kōji Yasukōchi	Photo Gallery International, Takushinkan and Shinzō Maeda (posthumous)	Yoshiyuki Akutagawa, Kiyoshi Takai	Keiko Nomura, Yūji Obata	Michio Hoshino and the exhibition "The World of Michio Hoshino"
2000	Jean-Claude Lemagny	Takao Kajiwara, Kon Sasaki	Kenrō Izu and Friends without a Border, JPC	Iwanami Shoten, Ryōichi Saitō	Arata Dodo, Toshiya Momose	[none]
2001	Mark Holborn	Takashi Kijima, Iwao Ogura (posthumous), 中井幸一	[none]	Tsuneo Enari, Teruo Okai, Kishin Shinoyama	Masaki Hirano, Masataka Nakano	Shōtarō Akiyama
2002	Fosco Maraini	Ieyoshi Mihori, Kazuo Nishii (posthumous), Hiroo Tsuzuki	Michiko Kasahara, Sapporo City Photo Library	Satoshi Kuribayashi, Hiroshi Sugimoto, Hiromi Nagakura	Rinko Kawauchi, Yuki Onodera	Eikoh Hosoe
2003	Sebastião Salgado	Kunika Todoriki, Senzō Yoshioka	Guardian Garden, Etsurō Ishihara	Naoya Hatakeyama, Ryūichi Hirokawa, Taishi Hirokawa	Yasuaki Kagii, Haruto Maeda, Hiroaki Yoshino	Nika Association of Photographers

=== 2004–2008 ===
Year	International	Distinguished Contributions	Cultural Advancement	Annual	Lifetime Achievement	Scholastic	Newcomer's	Special
2004	Kim Seung-kon	Yoshikatsu Saeki, Kenzō Yamamoto	Kiyosato Museum of Photographic Arts "Young Portfolio", Aichi Village (Nagano) and the Preservation Society for Photographs of Motoichi Kumagai	Hiroh Kikai, Toshinobu Takeuchi	Daidō Moriyama, Jun'ichi Ōta	Eiko Imahashi	石塚元太良, 八木清	[none]
2005	Anne W. Tucker	Ikkō Narahara, Shōmei Tōmatsu	Documentary Photo Festival Miyazaki	Mitsuhiko Imamori, Ken'ichi Komatsu	Akira Kinoshita, Eiichirō Sakata	[none]	Shōin Kajii, Ken Morisawa, 勝又邦彦	谷忠昭
2006	EU-Japan Fest Japan Committee	Shigeichi Nagano, Masaaki Nishimiya	General Photography Festival "Photo City Sagamihara" Committee, Shoji Ueda Museum of Photography	Hideaki Uchiyama	Miyako Ishiuchi	Teruo Okai	Kensuke Kazama, Masako Oguri, Kōji Onaka	[none]
2007	Terry Bennett	Minoru Ōnishi, Yōho Tsuda, 倉持悟郎 (posthumous)	Iida, 実行委員会 of the "How are you, photography?" exhibition of the Kyoto Photography Club	Ikuo Nakamura	Akito Mizutani, Yoshimitsu Nagasaka	Yuri Mitsuda	Ken Kitano, Kazutoshi Yoshimura	J. Wally Higgins
2008	Martin Parr	Ken'ichi Honda	Sōkyūsha	Risaku Suzuki, Ryūichirō Suzuki, Masato Seto	Shinpei Asai, Bishin Jumonji	Masafumi Fukagawa	Naoki Ishikawa, Takayuki Maekawa, Toshihiro Yashiro	Toshirō Shimoyama

=== 2009–2017 ===
Year	International	Distinguished Contributions	Lifetime Achievement	Scholastic	Newcomer's
2009	梅津禎三	上野一郎, Norihiko Matsumoto	Toshio Shibata	Kōtarō Iizawa	Yasuhiro Ogawa, Shintarō Saitō (photographer)
2010	[none]	多田亜生, Osamu Hiraki, 森山眞弓	Yukio Ōyama, Keizō Kitajima, Yoshihiro Tatsuki	Keishō Ishiguro, Ryūichi Kaneko	Keiko Sasaoka, Aya Fujioka
2011	Chris Pichler	Keiichi Kimura, Tsuneko Sasamoto, Yoshiharu Fukuhara	Kikuji Kawada, Yasumasa Morimura, Herbie Yamaguchi	Shino Kuraishi	Ryo Ohwada, Toshiya Murakoshi
2012	Kyoko Yamagishi	Keisuke Kumakiri, Koji Taki, Tatsuo Fukushima, Osamu Murai	Bon Ishikawa, Yutaka Takanashi, Takashi Homma	Akiko Okatsuka	Kentaro Kumon, Asako Saito
2013	[none]	Shigeru Chatani, Minoru Yamada	Kazuo Kitai, Seiichi Motohashi	Osamu Ueno	Sohei Nishino, Tamaki Yura
2014	Kazuyoshi Nomachi	Souichi Kubo, Takeyoshi Tanuma	Yoshihiko Ueda, Issei Suda	Noriko Tsutatani	Harumichi Saito, Tetsuro Shimizu
2015	Simon Baker	Kunio Kawaguchi, Eiji Tsubayama	Yoshiichi Hara, Sanjiro Minamikawa	Mari Shirayama	Ryuichi Ishikawa, Seiya Nakai
2016	In Jin Choi and translation team of The History of Korean Photography 1631-1945	Shisei Kuwabara, Shashinkosha Inc. (Takuji Yanagisawa), Naotaka Hirota	Naoya Hatakeyama, Shin Yamagishi	Masafumi Kohara	Takashi Arai, Ari Hatsuzawa
2017	Museum of Fine Arts, Boston	Tsuneo Enari	Shinya Arimoto, Mitsugu Onishi	Shigemi Takahashi, Manabu Torihara	Moyuru Tsurusaki, Daisuke Yokota

=== 2018-2020 ===
Year	International	Distinguished Contributions	Lifetime Achievement	Curatorial	Newcomer's
2018	Sandra Phillips	Toshio Saito, Nikon Salon	Tokuko Ushioda	Jō Takeba	Atsushi Okuyama, Takehiko Sato
2019	Manfried Heiting/ Kaneko Ryuichi "The Japanese Photobook 1912-1990"	Keiso Tomioka, Naohisa Hara	Mao Ishikawa	Chihiro Minato	Kawori Inbe, Ryo Minemizu
2020	Mark Pearson	Koichi Miyazawa, Japan Alpine Photographers Association	Naoki Ishikawa	Akiyoshi Tani	Hiroshi Ikeda, Aki Goto
2021	[none]	[none]	[none]	[none]	[none]
2022	太田菜穂子 榮榮＆映里	Hiromi Tsuchida株式会社便利堂	Michiko Kon	甲斐義明 Yurie Nagashima	Motonari Tagawa
2023	石渡真弥 KYOTOGRAPHIE 京都国際写真祭	Shunji Dodo写真新世紀	Chikashi Kasai	Ken Ohyama 雑誌『写真』編集部	Nao Nakai
