= Kiyosato Museum of Photographic Arts =

Photographic art museum in Japan

Coordinates: 35°52′58.96″N 138°25′55.56″E

The Kiyosato Museum of Photographic Arts (清里フォトアートミュージアム, Kiyosato Foto-Āto Myūjiamu) is a gallery of photography in the Kiyosato region of the city of Hokuto, Yamanashi (Japan).

The gallery was founded in 1995; Eikoh Hosoe has been its director since its opening.

The gallery, which also refers to itself as "K*MoPA", "embraces photographic art made in the affirmation of life"; this does not exclude harsh images. It attempts to acquire prints of archival quality, and is particularly keen to encourage younger photographers to submit their work for consideration. The work of young photographers that the gallery accepts is exhibited in an annual series of "Young Portfolio" exhibitions, perhaps inspired by a major opening exhibition in which twenty-five well-established Japanese photographers exhibited work that they had done while still in their twenties. (Note: Works by 25 Photographers in their 20s; the photographers were Nobuyoshi Araki, Shin'ya Fujiwara, Shinzō Hanabusa, Eikoh Hosoe, Hisae Imai, Yasuhiro Ishimoto, Mitsuaki Iwagō, Kikuji Kawada, Akira Kinoshita, Shisei Kuwabara, Daidō Moriyama, Shigeichi Nagano, Masatoshi Naitō, Ikkō Narahara, Kazuyoshi Nomachi, Yoshino Ōishi, Kishin Shinoyama, Yutaka Takanashi, Takeyoshi Tanuma, Yoshihiro Tatsuki, Shōmei Tōmatsu, Haruo Tomiyama, Hiromi Tsuchida and Noriaki Yokosuka.)

Exhibitions have generally been thematic, but photographers with solo retrospectives have included Manuel Álvarez Bravo, Shisei Kuwabara and others. Exhibition catalogues are available directly from the museum.

The closest station to the gallery is Kiyosato Station, on the Koumi Line.
