= Japan Photographic Society =

Japan Photographic Society may refer to:

- Japan Photographic Society (19th century)
- Japan Photographic Society (1924–)

== See also ==
- Japan Professional Photographers Society
- Photographic Society of Japan
