= Hideo Haga =

Japanese photographer (1921–2022)

Hideo Haga (芳賀 日出男 Haga Hideo, 10 September 1921 – 12 November 2022) was a Japanese photographer, known for his photography of traditional Japanese festivals and folk culture.

== Biography ==
Hideo Haga was born in Dalian, Manchuria on 10 September 1921. He took up the camera as a child, encouraged by his father, an engineer whose hobby was photography.

In 1941 he enrolled at Keio University, as a Literature major, where Haga also joined the camera club, often to the neglect of his studies. Lectures by the folklorist Shinobu Orikuchi (1887–1953), which he joined when he heard that credits were offered to anybody for attendance, were a strong influence on his future interests.

Haga graduated with a degree in literature in 1944. During the war he was recruited to make aerial photographs for the navy, and in 1946 found employment with the Nippon Telegraph and Telephone company. Retrenched, he returned to live with his father and started to devote himself to photography of traditional culture. Heibonsha publishers issued his first book, on the Japanese rice festival, in 1959. A further thirty-five #books followed.

Haga Library Co., which he established in 1985 markets Haga's over 300 thousand stock photos, made over sixty years, of festivals and folk culture in Japan and other countries.

Haga died on 12 November 2022, at the age of 101.

== Career and recognition ==
In 1950 Haga was one of the founders of the Japan Professional Photographers Society (JPS) of which he became chairman for seven years in 1981.

In 1955 a photograph of a heavily pregnant woman against a blurred street scene by Hideo Haga (Pregnant Japanese Woman Hurrying on Her Way, 1952) was selected, for its (then) unusual public perspective on pregnancy, by Edward Steichen for MoMA’s The Family of Man exhibition which was seen by nine million people as it toured thirty-seven countries.

Haga was the producer for the Festival Plaza at Expo '70 in Osaka.

His book, Folk Customs of Japan - Festivals & Performing Arts, (Creo, 1997, ISBN 4877360158) shows his photographs in monochrome of festivals taken throughout Japan since the 1950s.

== Books ==
- "Ta no kami: Nihon no inasaku girei = The rituals of rice production in Japan". Tokyo: Heibonsha, 1959. (in Japanese)
- "Kamisama-tachi no kisetsu", Kadokawa Shoten, 1964. The seasons of the gods. (in Japanese)
- "Japanese folk festivals illustrated by Hideo Haga". Tokyo: Asahi Optical Co., 1970. Reprint, 1983.
- "La fiesta: all the world loves a festival", [Japan]: Genkosha, 1989.

Traditional daily lives along the Japanese Archipelago series, Komine Shoten. (in Japanese) ISBN 9784338220019, OCLC 144100987. 7 volumes chiefly color illustrations.

1. "Nihon rettō no shizen to kurashi".
2. "Nōson no dentōteki na kurashi".
3. "Gyoson no dentōteki na kurashi".
4. "Sanson no dentōteki na kurashi".
5. "Yukiguni no dentōteki na kurashi".
6. "Nantō no dentōteki na kurashi".
7. "Hokkoku Ainu no dentōteki na Kurashi".

- "Nihon no matsuri jiten". Tokyo: Chōbunsha, 2008.
- "Origichi Shinobu to kodai wo tabiyuku". Tokyo: Keio University Press, 2009. OCLC 1085245715
- "Miyamoto Tsuneichi to Haga Hideo ga aruita kyushu: showa 37-nen". Miyamoto, Tsuneichi; Haga, Hideo; Morimoto, Takashi. Tokyo: Mizunowa Shuppan, 2011 ISBN 978-4-86426-011-4, OCLC 922815974, (in Japanese).

== Awards ==
- 1988 - Silver Merit Medal, City of Vienna.
- 1989 - Medal of Honor with Purple Ribbon.
- 1995 - Order of the Rising Sun, fourth class, Gold Rays with Rosette.
- 1997 - Lifetime Achievement Award, Photographic Society of Japan. Iida City Fujimoto Shihachi Shashin Bunka-shō Photo Award.
- 2000 - Grand Prize, Pola Foundation of Japanese Culture. Literature Folk Culture Award
- 2008 - Travel Culture Study Award
