= Norio Kobayashi =

Japanese photographer (born 1952)

Norio Kobayashi (小林 のりお, Kobayashi Norio; born 1952) is a Japanese photographer.

== Early life ==
Kobayashi was born in Ōdate, Akita in 1952. He left Nippon Dental College in 1980, before graduation, and graduated from Tokyo College of Photography (postgraduate course) in 1983.

== Photography career ==
Kobayashi had a solo exhibition "Landscapes" at Gallery Eye-Heart, Tokyo in 1982, showing a series of landscapes taken in the urban marginal area, often developed for housing or a new city development.

In 1986 he published Landscape, was awarded the award for new photographers by the Photographic Society of Japan in 1987. First Light won the Kimura Ihei Award for photography in 1993.

Kobayashi's photographs were exhibited with those by Yūji Saiga, Naoya Hatakeyama and Toshio Yamane in an exhibition, Land of Paradox, that travelled around the US in 1996–97.

== Publications ==
- Ashiya City Museum of Art and History (芦屋市立美術館, Ashiya-shi Bijutsukan). Rando obu paradokkusu ランド・オブ・パラドックス) / Land of Paradox. Kyoto: Tankōsha, 1997. ISBN 4-473-01549-1.
- Fuku, Noriko, ed. Land of paradox: Yuji Saiga, Naoya Hatakeyama, Norio Kobayashi, Toshio Yamane. Daytona Beach, Fla: Daytona Beach Community College, 1996. ISBN 1-887040-16-1. Catalogue of the exhibition as held in the US.
- Last Home, Camera Works Tokyo No.10. 1983.
- Randosukēpu (ランドスケープ) / Japanese Landscapes. Tokyo: Ark One, 1986.
- Saishū (彩集). Tama, Tokyo: Tama City, 1991. The photographs are by Kobayashi.
- Fāsuto raito (ファ-スト・ライト) / First Light: Japanese Landscape. Tokyo: Atelier Peyotl, 1992. ISBN 4-89342-181-6.
- Surface, Booth-Clibborn Editions, England. 1996. (collaboration)
