= Ouchi =

Ouchi or Ōuchi may refer to:

== Geography ==
- Ouchi, Hubei (藕池镇), a town in Gong'an County, Jingzhou, Hubei, China

=== Japan ===
- Ōuchi, Akita, a town now merged into Yurihonjō, Akita
- Ouchi, Saga, a town now merged into Karatsu City, Saga
- Ōuchi-juku, a post station in Japan's Edo period

== People ==
- Ōuchi clan, powerful and important family in Japan during the reign of the Ashikaga shogunate in the 12th to 14th centuries
- Haruto Ouchi (born 2002), Japanese curler
- Hichirō Ouchi (尾内 七郎; 1913–2005), Japanese photographer
- Hisashi Ouchi, technician involved in the 1999 Tokaimura nuclear accident
- Keigo Ōuchi (1930–2016), Japanese politician
- Ōuchi Hyōei, Japanese economist
- Nobuyuki Ōuchi (大内 延介; 1941 – 2017), Japanese former professional shogi player
- William G. Ouchi (born 1943), American professor and author in the field of business management
- Issei Ouchi, (born 2000) Japanese footballer

== Judo techniques ==
- Ouchi gaeshi
- Ōuchi gari

== See also ==
- Ouchi Station
- Ouchy, a lakeside resort in Switzerland
