= Takeyoshi =

- Gender: Male

Origin
- Origin: Japanese
- Meaning: Different meanings depending on the kanji used

Takeyoshi (written: 喬義 or 武能) is a masculine Japanese given name. Notable people with the name include:

- Buyūzan Takeyoshi (武雄山 喬義) (born 1974), Japanese sumo wrestler
- Takeyoshi Tanuma (田沼 武能) (born 1929), Japanese photographer
