= Tokutarō =

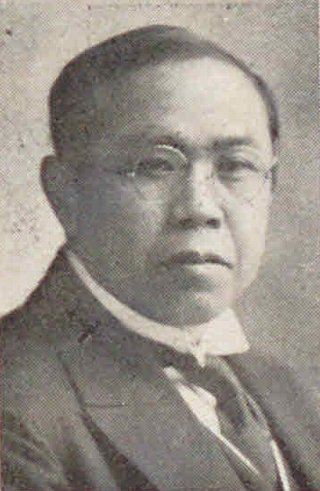
- Tokutaro Shimizu (1882–1963), Japanese politician
- Pronunciation: tokɯtaɾoɯ (IPA)
- Gender: Male

Origin
- Origin: Japanese
- Meaning: Different meanings depending on the kanji used

Other names
- Alternative spelling: Tokutaro (Kunrei-shiki) Tokutaro (Nihon-shiki) Tokutarō, Tokutaro, Tokutarou, Tokutaroh (Hepburn)

Tokutarō is a masculine Japanese given name.

== Written forms ==
Tokutarō can be written using different combinations of kanji characters. Some examples:

The characters used for "taro" (太郎) literally means "thick (big) son" and usually used as a suffix to a masculine name, especially for the first son. The "toku" part of the name can use a variety of characters, each of which will change the meaning of the name ("徳" for benevolence, "得" for gain, "啄" and so on).

- 徳太郎, "benevolence, big son"
- 得太郎, "gain, big son"
- 啄太郎, "peck, big son"
- 篤太郎, "sincere, big son"
- 竺太郎, "bamboo, big son"

Other combinations...

- 徳太朗, "benevolence, thick, bright"
- 徳多朗, "benevolence, many, bright"
- 徳汰朗, "benevolence, excessive, bright"
- 得太朗, "gain, thick, bright"
- 得多朗, "gain, many, bright"
- 登久太郎, "climb up, long time, big son"

The name can also be written in hiragana とくたろう or katakana トクタロウ.

== Notable people with the name ==
- Tokutaro Sakurai (桜井 徳太郎; 1897–1980), Japanese general
- Tokutaro Shimizu (清水 徳太郎; 1882–1963), Japanese politician
- Tokutaro Takayama (高山 登久太郎; 1928–2003), Japanese Yakuza member
- Tokutarō Tanaka (田中 徳太郎; 1909–1989), Japanese photographer
- Tokutaro Ukon (右近 徳太郎; 1913–1944), Japanese footballer
- Tokutarō Watanabe, Japanese businessman
