= Mao Ishikawa =

Okinawan photographer (born 1953)

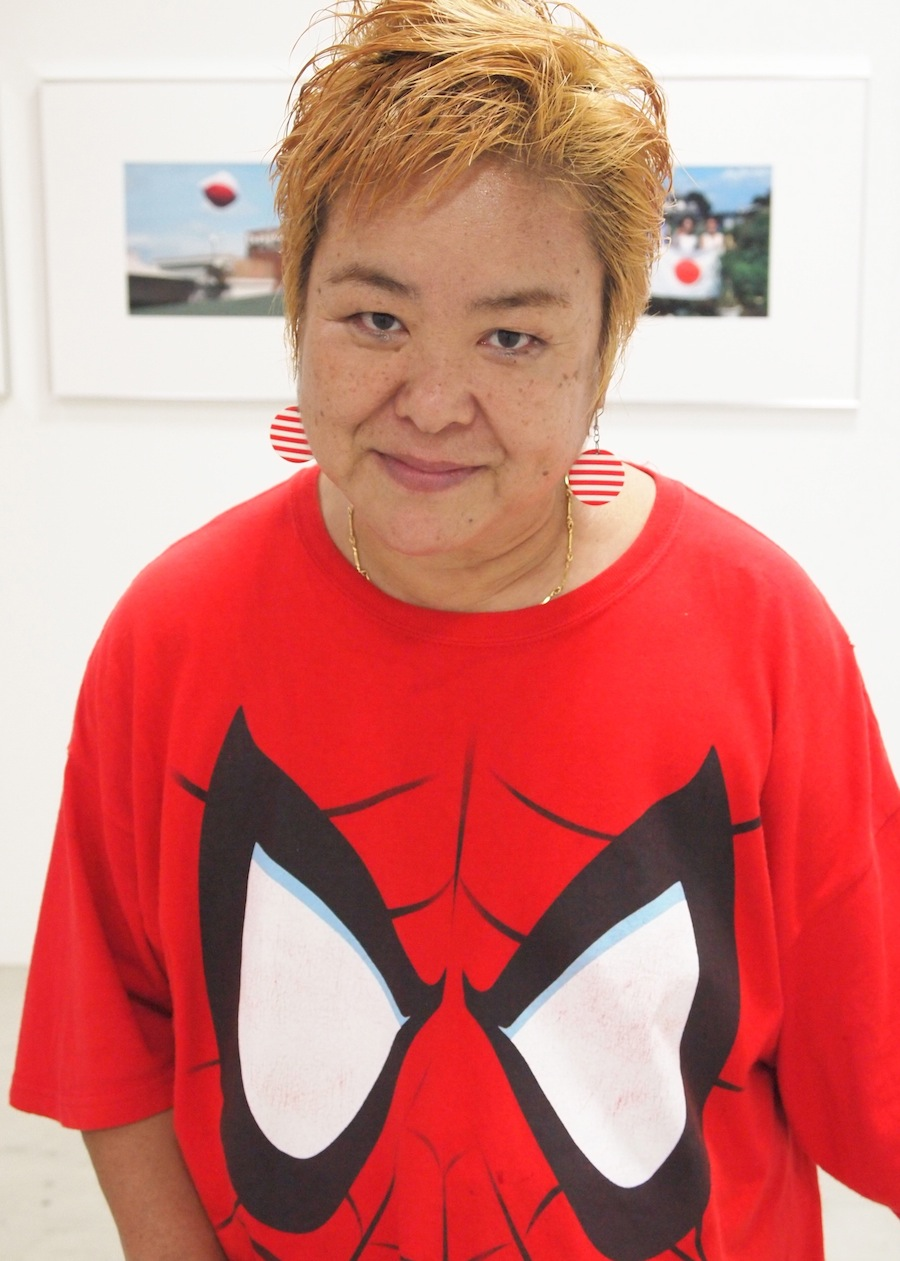
- Born: April 26, 1953 (age 72); Okinawa, Japan
- Education: Workshop School of Photography
- Notable work: Hot Days in Camp Hansen (1982), A Port Town Elegy(1990), Philippines(1989)
- Awards: Lifetime Achievement Award, Photographic Society of Japan

Mao Ishikawa (石川真生, Ishikawa Mao; born in Ōgimi, April 26, 1953) is an Okinawan photographer and activist. Her photographs largely feature bar girls, performers, soldiers, and other fringe members within Okinawan and Japanese society. Ishikawa's earlier works are characterized by her approach to photography which involved the photographer's immersion in the environment of her images, whether by living with her subject or working in close proximity to them. In her photographs of active soldiers and military bases both in and outside of Japan beginning from the 1990s, Ishikawa has more directly addressed political undercurrents, namely contempt for the U.S. military presence in Okinawa and distrust of the Japanese government. Her most recent series Great Ryukyu Photo Scroll (大琉球写真絵巻) (2014-) approaches the same themes through a narrative tone, using satire and pop culture references to reconstruct important moments in Okinawan history.

Ishikawa's work has been exhibited at the Yokohama Museum of Art, Queensland Art Gallery, Tokyo Photographic Art Museum, Okinawa Prefectural Museum, MoMA PS1 and various art galleries in New York, London, and throughout Japan. In 2019, she received the Lifetime Achievement Award by the Photographic Society of Japan.

== Biography ==
Ishikawa Mao attended high school in Naha City and was a non-active member of her school's photo club. As a high school student, Ishikawa observed and participated in anti-reversion protests organized by the New Left. Following a falling out with her family in 1972, Ishikawa left home to join a group of student activists in Tokyo. While living in Tokyo, in 1974, Ishikawa attended the Workshop Shashin Gakkō (Workshop School of Photography) to study with Shōmei Tōmatsu (the school was founded by him and other influential photographers including Nobuyoshi Araki, Masahisa Fukase, and Daidō Moriyama in 1974 and lasted through 1976). Ishikawa financed her education using money her mother initially had offered as payment for a kimono to be worn to a coming of age ceremony. She returned to Okinawa that same year after restoring her relationship with her mother. Ishikawa bought her first camera and undertook her first photography commission to investigate and document evidence of suspected crimes thought to have been committed at a pineapple factory in Nago (these claims were later found to be unsubstantiated).

In 1975, Ishikawa moved to Koza City (currently Okinawa City) and sought work at bars catering to Black soldiers in Teruya and Kin Town. Although Ishikawa was initially motivated by a desire to photograph the U.S. presence in Okinawa, her attention turned towards the women servicing these bars. Ishikawa's images from the 1970s reflect her admiration and affection for working-class Okinawan women that would persist throughout her career. Under the Okinawan photographer collective Aman (あーまん), Ishikawa published these images in her breakout photobook Hot Days in Camp Hansen (1982). As a testament to Ishikawa's immersive shooting style, intimate photographs of Ishikawa herself, shot by fellow Okinawa photographer Toyamitsu Higa, are also featured in the book. Hot Days in Camp Hansen was met with great criticism and Ishikawa was forced to manually removed pages from each copy because of objections from select women who appeared in the book.

As a consequence from the fallout of her first book, Ishikawa divorced her first husband; she later moved to Tomigusuku in 1983 and opened an izakaya near Aja-Shinko port in Naha. The rowdy fishermen and dockworkers who frequented her bar emerged as the subjects for her book A Port Town Elegy (1990). Despite managing a bar and caring for a young daughter (b. 1980), Ishikawa began following local performer Nakada Sachiko and her theatrical group. Her images of the famed Okinawan entertainer were published in Sachiko Nakada's Theater Company (仲田幸子一行物語) (1991). During this time Ishikawa also worked part time for Aman doing administrative work.

From the mid-1980s, Ishikawa's growing interest in the international impact of military bases led her to venture outside of Japan. Her images from this period reveal how the lives of the people she met in Okinawa eventually unfolded once they left the island. In 1986, Ishikawa spent two months in the U.S. upon an invitation to stay with former G.I Myron Carr, a close friend she met while working in Koza. The scenes of African American communities in inner city Philadelphia were used in her series Life in Philly which was shown at the Minolta Photo Space in Tokyo the same year. With the support of Zen Foto Gallery, and texts written by Tōmatsu Shōmei and Takeuchi Keisuke, this series was turned into a photobook nearly 30 years later. In 1988, Ishikawa revisited the bars that she had formerly worked at in the 1970s and found that the majority of workers were immigrants from the Philippines. After befriending some of the dancers, Ishikawa accompanied one of the women on a trip back to her hometown in Manila between 1988 and 1989. She later self-published the images from her trip in the book Philippines (フィリピン) (1989).

Once she returned from the Philippines, Ishikawa took on numerous jobs photographing for local news organizations including Okinawa Times and Ryukyu Shimpo. In addition to covering events and important figures within Okinawa prefecture, Ishikawa traveled to other Asian and South Asian countries including Indonesia (1991), Singapore(1991), Korea (1992) and Taiwan (1992). Throughout the 1990s and 2000s, Ishikawa maintained her working relationship with both organizations, authoring newspaper columns and photographing local news.

Since 2000, Ishikawa has struggled with repeated incidences of cancer. In 2000, Ishikawa was diagnosed with kidney cancer; in 2001, she was diagnosed with rectal cancer, undergoing surgery that left her with a permanent colostomy bag; in 2017, she was found to have stage 4 cancer. Despite her condition, Ishikawa remains active as a photographer, releasing multiple books and exhibiting her work internationally. In 2010, Ishikawa was awarded the Sagamihara Photo Awards for her book FENCES, OKINAWA. In the subsequent year, she published Here's What the Japanese Flag Means to Me (日の丸を観る目) (2011), a strong critique of the Japanese government featuring interviews and photographs taken of Japanese and international participants from 1993 to 2011.

Starting in 2014, Ishikawa has photographed images for Great Ryukyu Photo Scroll, periodically exhibiting parts of the series as she completes them. In 2017, Ishikawa postponed lifesaving surgery in order to attend exhibitions and events related to this project as well as her first internationally published photobook Red Flower: The Women of Okinawa (2017). She eventually underwent surgery in July and exhibited parts 1-4 of her Great Ryukyu Photo Scroll series in September of that year. A crowdfunding campaign raised over 2,500,000 yen to cover costs related to her cancer treatment and exhibition.

== Exhibitions ==
- The Perpetual Moment –Visions from within Okinawa and Korea, MoMA PS1 (October–December 2004)
- Okinawa Prismed 1872–2008, The National Museum of Modern Art Tokyo (October–December 2008)
- 原田正路/石川真生 (Harada Masamichi/Ishikawa Mao), Yokohama Museum of Art (December 2011 – March 2012)
- All You Need is Love, Mori Art Museum (April–September 2013)
- A Port Town Elegy, Zen Foto Gallery (March 2015)
- The 9th Asia Pacific Triennal of Contemporary Art (APT9), Queensland Art Gallery (November 2018 – April 2019)
- TOP Collection: Photography in the Ryukyu Islands, Tokyo Photographic Art Museum (September–November 2020)

== Publications ==
- 熱き日々inキャンプハンセン‼︎ (≈ Hot Days in Camp Hansen‼︎). Okinawa: Aman, 1982.
- フィリピン(≈ Philippines). Ishikawa Mao (self-published), 1989.
- 港町エレジー (≈ A Port Town Elegy ). Ishikawa Mao (self-published), 1990.
- 仲田幸子一行物語 (≈ Sachiko Nakada's Theatre Company). Ishikawa Mao (self-published), 1991.
- 沖縄と自衛隊 (≈ Okinawa and the Japanese Self Defense Forces). Tokyo: Koubunken, 1995. ISBN 4874981593
- Ishikawa, Mao, Nagamoto T. and Kuniyoshi K. これが沖縄の米軍だ (U.S. Forces in Okinawa ). Tokyo: Koubunken, 1995. ISBN 487498178X Text written by Ishikawa Mao and Nagamoto Tomohiro; drawings by Kuniyoshi Kazuo.
- 沖縄海上ヘリ基地. Tokyo: Koubunken, 1998. ISBN 4874982034
- 沖縄ソウル (Okinawa Soul). Ohta, 2002. ISBN 978-4872336863
- Urashima, Etsuko and Ishikawa, Mao. シマが揺れる—沖縄・海辺のムラの物語. Tokyo: Koubunken, 2006. ISBN 4874983731
- Fences, Okinawa. Tokyo: Miraisha, 2010. ISBN 4624900251
- Life in Philly. Tokyo: Zen Foto Gallery / Gallery OUT of PLACE, 2010.
- 日の丸を観る目 (Here's What the Japanese Flag Means to Me). Tokyo: Miraisha, 2011. ISBN 4624710932
- Fences, Fuck You. Ishikawa Mao (self-published), 2012.
- Hot Days in Okinawa. FOIL, 2013. ISBN 4902943808
- 森花—夢の世界 (Morika's Dreams). Tokyo: Miraisha, 2014.
- 港町エレジー(A Port Town Elegy). Tokyo: Zen Foto Gallery, 2015.
- Red Flower: The Women of Okinawa. New York: Session, 2017. ISBN 0692817441

== Filmography ==
- ANPO: Art X War (2010)
- OKINAWA The Afterburn (2015). A documentary film by director John Junkerman about the Battle of Okinawa and the U.S. military presence in Okinawa. Ishikawa appears as one of the narrators.
- From Okinawa With Love (2023). Documentary about Ishikawa's works and memory, directed by Hiroshi Sunairi.

== General references ==
- Ishikawa, Mao. 沖縄ソウル. Ohta, 2002. ISBN 978-4872336863
