= Banri =

- Gender: Male

Origin
- Origin: Japanese
- Meaning: Different meanings depending on the kanji used

Banri (written: 万里 or 萬里) is a masculine Japanese given name. Notable people with the name include:

- Banri Kaieda (海江田 万里; born 1949), Japanese politician
- Banri Namikawa (並河 萬里; 1931–2006), Japanese photographer

Fictional characters:

- Banri Tada (多田 万里), protagonist of the light novel series Golden Time
- Banri Watanuki (渡狸 卍里), a character in the manga series Inu x Boku SS
- Banri Settsu (摂津 万里), a character in the video game A3!
- Banri Shiroishi (白石 万浬), a character in the media franchise From Argonavis
