= Yūkichi =

Yukichi
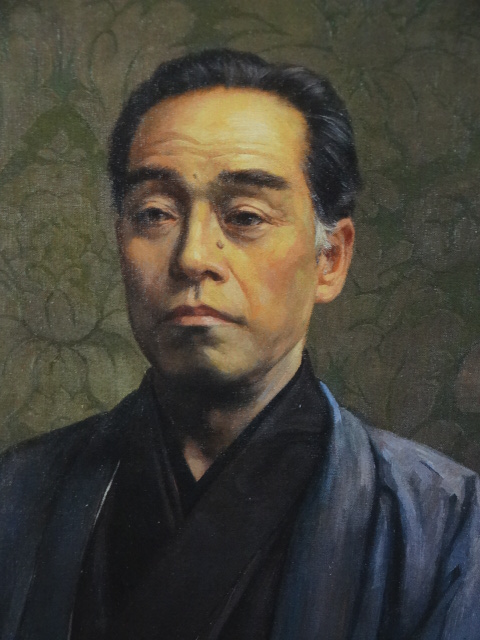
- Yukichi Fukuzawa (1835–1901), Japanese writer.
- Pronunciation: jɯɯkʲitɕi, jɯkʲitɕi (IPA)
- Gender: Male

Origin
- Origin: Japanese
- Meaning: Different meanings depending on the kanji used

Other names
- Alternative spelling: Yukiti (Kunrei-shiki) Yukiti (Nihon-shiki) Yukichi, Yūkichi, Yuukichi (Hepburn)

Yūkichi, Yukichi or Yuukichi is a masculine Japanese given name.

== Written forms ==
Yūkichi can be written using different combinations of kanji characters. Here are some examples:

- 勇吉, "courage, good luck"
- 祐吉, "to help, good luck"
- 佑吉, "to help, good luck"
- 裕吉, "abundant, good luck"
- 雄吉, "male, good luck"
- 友吉, "friend, good luck"
- 悠吉, "long time, good luck"
- 優吉, "superiority, good luck"
- 有吉, "to have, good luck"
- 邑吉, "village, good luck"

The name can also be written in hiragana ゆうきち or katakana ユウキチ.

Yukichi is a separate given name.

- 諭吉, "to persuade, good luck"
- 愉吉, "pleased, good luck"
- 愈吉, "more and more, good luck"

And can also be written in hiragana ゆきち or katakana ユキチ.

== Notable people with the name ==
- Yukichi Amano (天野 祐吉; 1933–2013), Japanese writer
- Yukichi Fukuzawa (福澤 諭吉; 1835–1901), Japanese writer
- Yukichi Maeda (前田 雄吉; born 1960), Japanese politician
- Yūkichi Takeda (武田 祐吉; 1886–1958), Japanese scholar
- Yūkichi Watabe (渡部 雄吉; 1924–1993), Japanese photographer

== Other uses ==
- 10,000 yen notes depicting Yukichi Fukuzawa are sometimes referred to as "Yukichi"
