= Nagakura =

Nagakura (written: 永倉 or 長倉) is a Japanese surname. Notable people with the surname include:

- Hayate Nagakura (長倉 颯, born 1996), Japanese footballer
- Hiromi Nagakura (長倉 洋海, born 1952), Japanese photographer
- Nagakura Shinpachi (永倉 新八, 1839–1915), Japanese swordsman and member of the Shinsengumi
