= Kinsuke =

- Gender: Male

Origin
- Origin: Japanese
- Meaning: Different meanings depending on the kanji used

Kinsuke (written: 謹介 or 謹助) is a masculine Japanese given name. Notable people with the name include:

- Endō Kinsuke (遠藤 謹助; 1836–1893), Japanese samurai
- Kinsuke Shimada (島田 謹介; 1900–1994), Japanese photographer
