= Yoshioka (surname) =

Yoshioka (written: 吉岡) is a Japanese surname. Notable people with the surname include:

- Hidetaka Yoshioka (born 1970), Japanese actor
- Junko Yoshioka, Japanese fashion designer
- Kazuya Yoshioka (born 1978), Japanese ski jumper
- Kiyoe Yoshioka (born 1984), Japanese singer
- Miho Yoshioka (吉岡 美帆; born 1990), Japanese sailor
- Osamu Yoshioka (1934–2010), Japanese lyricist
- Satoshi Yoshioka (born 1987), Japanese footballer
- Senzō Yoshioka (1916–2005), Japanese photographer
- Takao Yoshioka, Japanese screenwriter
- Takayoshi Yoshioka (1909–1984), Japanese athlete
- Tokujin Yoshioka (born 1970), Japanese artist
- Toshiki Yoshioka (born 1976), Japanese racing driver
- Yoshioka Yayoi (1871–1959), Japanese physician
- Yui Yoshioka (born 1987), Japanese singer
