= Toshio =

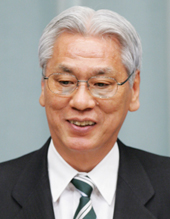
- Toshio Ogawa. Vice President of the House of Councillors of Japan.
- Pronunciation: toɕio (IPA)
- Gender: Male

Origin
- Origin: Japanese
- Meaning: Different meanings depending on the kanji used
- Region of origin: Japan

Other names
- Alternative spelling: Tosio (Kunrei-shiki) Tosio (Nihon-shiki) Toshio (Hepburn)

Toshio is a common masculine Japanese given name.

== Written forms ==
Toshio can be written using different kanji characters and can mean:

- 敏夫, "agile, man"
- 敏男, "agile, man"
- 敏雄, "agile, male"
- 俊夫, "sagacious, man"
- 俊雄, "sagacious, male"
- 利生, "advantage, life"
- 寿雄, "long life, male"
- 登志男, "ascend, intention, man"

The name can also be written in hiragana としお or katakana トシオ.

== Notable people with the name ==
- Toshio Fukumoto (福元 寿夫; born 1960), Japanese water polo player
- Toshio Furukawa (古川 登志夫, born 1946), Japanese voice actor
- Toshio Gotō (後藤 俊夫, born 1938), Japanese film director
- Toshio Iwai (岩井 俊雄, born 1962), Japanese interactive media and installation artist
- Toshio Iwatani (岩谷 俊夫; 1925–1970), Japanese footballer
- Toshio Jingu (神宮 敏男; born 1948), Japanese fencer
- Toshio Kakei (筧 利夫, born 1962), Japanese actor
- Toshio Kimura (木村 俊夫, 1909–1983), Japanese politician
- Toshio Maeda (前田 俊夫, born 1953), Japanese manga artist
- Toshio Masuda (舛田 利雄, born 1927), Japanese film director
- Toshio Matsumoto (松本 俊夫; 1932–2017), Japanese film director
- Toshio Matsumoto (dancer) (松本 利夫; born 1975), Japanese dancer and actor
- Toshio Motoya (元谷 外志雄; born 1943), Japanese writer, publisher and businessman
- Toshio Nakanishi, a Japanese musician and an artist
- Tosiwo Nakayama (中山 利雄, 1931–2003), first president of the Federated States of Micronesia
- Toshio Odate (トシオ・オダテ, born 1930), Japanese-born American sculptor
- Toshio Ogawa (小川 敏夫, born 1948), Japanese politician
- Toshio Shibata (柴田 敏雄, born 1949), Japanese photographer
- Toshio Shimao (島尾 敏雄, 1917–1986), Japanese novelist
- Toshio Suzuki (driver) (鈴木 利男, born 1955), Japanese racing driver
- Toshio Suzuki (producer) (鈴木 敏夫, born 1948), chief producer of the Japanese animation studio Studio Ghibli
- Toshio Tamogami (田母神 俊雄, born 1948), Japanese Air Self-Defense Force career military officer
- Toshio Tosanoumi (土佐ノ海 敏生, born 1972), Japanese sumo wrestler
- Toshio Ukishima (浮島 敏男; born 1949), Japanese politician
- Toshio Takahashi (高橋 敏夫; born 1949), Japanese water polo player
- Toshio Wakita (脇田 寿雄; born 1965), Japanese bobsledder
- Toshio Yamada (山田 俊男; born 1946), Japanese politician
- Toshio Yamaguchi (山口 敏夫; born 1940), Japanese politician
- Toshio Yamane (山根 敏郎, born 1953), Japanese photographer
- Toshio Narahashi (トシオ・ナラハシ, 1927–2013), Japanese-born American pharmacologist

== Fictional characters ==
- Toshio Ozaki (尾崎 敏夫), a protagonist in the horror novel/manga/anime series Shiki
- Toshio Saeki (Ju-on) (佐伯 俊雄), a main antagonist in the Japanese horror series Ju-on
- Toshio Utsumi (内海 俊夫), a character in the anime and manga series Cat's Eye
