= Namikawa =

Namikawa is a Japanese surname. Notable people with the surname include:

- Banri Namikawa (並河 萬里, 1931–2006), Japanese photographer
- Daisuke Namikawa (浪川 大輔, born 1976), Japanese voice actor
- Namikawa Sōsuke (1847–1910), Japanese cloisonné artist
- Namikawa Yasuyuki (1845–1927), Japanese cloisonné artist

== See also ==
- Namikawa Station
