= Hiroji =

- Gender: Male

Origin
- Origin: Japanese
- Meaning: Different meanings depending on the kanji used

Other names
- Variant form: Kōji

Hiroji (written: 博二, 博治 or 弘次) is a masculine Japanese given name. As 弘次, the name also may be read as Kōji. Notable people with the name include:

- Hiroji Imamura (今村 博治; born 1949), Japanese footballer
- Hiroji Kataoka (片岡 弘次; born 1941), Japanese academic and translator
- Hiroji Kiyotake (清武 博二; born 1961), Japanese video game designer
- Hiroji Kubota (久保田 博二; born 1939), Japanese photographer
- Hiroji Satoh (佐藤 博治; 1925–2000), Japanese table tennis player
- Kōji Mitsui (三井 弘次; 1910–1979), Japanese actor
