= Norihiko =

- Gender: Male

Origin
- Origin: Japanese
- Meaning: Different meanings depending on the kanji used

Norihiko (written: 則彦, 徳彦, 憲彦, 範彦 or 謙彦) is a masculine Japanese given name. Notable people with the name include:

- Norihiko Akagi (赤城 徳彦; born 1959), Japanese politician
- Norihiko Hibino (日比野 則彦; born 1973), Japanese video game composer and saxophonist
- Norihiko Kitahara (北原 憲彦; born 1954), Japanese basketball player
- Norihiko Kurahashi (倉橋 範彦; born 1932), Japanese swimmer
- Norihiko Matsumoto (松本 徳彦; born 1936), Japanese photographer
- Norihiko Miyazaki (宮崎 謙彦; born 1969), Japanese volleyball player
