= Kōnosuke =

- Gender: Male

Origin
- Origin: Japanese
- Meaning: Different meanings depending on the kanji used

Kōnosuke, Konosuke, Kounosuke or Kohnosuke (written: 鋼之介, 耿之介 or 幸之助) is a masculine Japanese given name. Notable people with the name include:

- Kōnosuke Hinatsu (日夏 耿之介; 1890–1971), pen-name of Higuchi Kunito, Japanese poet
- Kōnosuke Ishii (石井 幸之助; 1916–1997), Japanese photographer
- Kōnosuke Matsushita (松下 幸之助; 1894–1989), Japanese businessman
- Konosuke Nishikawa (西川 幸之介; born 2002), Japanese footballer
- Ōhō Kōnosuke (王鵬 幸之介; born 2000), Japanese sumo wrestler
- Konosuke Sano (佐野 幸之助; 1894–?), Japanese long-distance runner
- Konosuke Takeshita (竹下 幸之介; born 1995), Japanese professional wrestler
- Kōnosuke Uda (宇田 鋼之介; born 1966), Japanese anime director
- Konosuke Yanagimoto (柳本 幸之介; born 2003), Japanese Olympic swimmer
