= Yoshikawa Tomizo =

Japanese photographer

Yoshikawa Tomizo (吉川富三; よしかわ とみぞう, 1900 – 1995) was a Japanese photographer. He served as a senior director of the Photographic Society of Japan and received a Distinguished Contribution award from the Photographic Society of Japan awards in 1965. He also served as chairman of the Tokyo Photographic Research Association (ja:東京写真研究会).
