= Photo City Sagamihara =

Japanese photography award

Photo City Sagamihara (フォトシティさがみはら, Fotoshiti Sagamihara, PCS) is a photographic award that has been sponsored annually by the city of Sagamihara since 2001.

There are four kinds of awards: the main prize for professionals (さがみはら写真賞, Sagamihara shashinshō), prizes for newcomer professionals (さがみはら写真新人奨励賞, Sagamihara shashin shinjin shōrei-shō), one prize for Asian photographers (さがみはら写真アジア賞, Sagamihara shashin Ajia-shō) (in which "Asian" is taken to exclude Japan), and various awards for amateurs (さがみはらアマチュア写真グランプリ, Sagamihara amachua shashin guranpuri). The winning photographs are displayed in Sagamihara Citizen's Gallery.

Annual award for Japanese professionals
Year	Photographer
2001	Ryūichi Hirokawa
2002	Hiroh Kikai
2003	Hiromi Nagakura
2004	Seiichi Furuya
2005	Masaru Gotō
2006	Shisei Kuwabara
2007	Hiroshi Watanabe
2008	Masataka Nakano
2009	Eiji Ina
2010	Naoki Ishikawa

== Sources ==
- (in Japanese) Sagamihara-shi Sōgō Shashin-sai: Fotoshiti Sagamihara 2007 Kōshiki Gaidobukku (相模原市総合写真祭：フォトシティさがみはら2007公式ガイドブック).
