= Keiichi Tahara =

Japanese photographer

- Born: August 20, 1951; Kyoto
- Died: June 6, 2017 (aged 65)
- Occupation: Photographer
- Notable work: Garden of Light

Keiichi Tahara (田原桂一, Tahara Keiichi; 20 August 1951 – 6 June 2017) was a Japanese photographer.

== Life and career ==
Tahara Keiichi was born in Kyoto in 1951. His parents divorced when he was two years old. His mother remarried a kimono wholesaler, a kimono manufacturer who takes orders from wholesalers and brings together various artisans specializing in dyeing, embroidery, weaving, and Japanese tailoring to complete the kimono. Tahara had a natural affinity for kimonos. His mother was a painter, but she also worked as a kimono designer. Of particular note is his maternal grandfather, who ran a photography studio and adored his grandson. Tahara spent a lot of time in his grandfather's studio and learned photographic techniques naturally.

In 1972, he travelled Europe with Red Buddha Theatre as a lighting and visual technician. While in France, he encountered a sharp, harsh and piercing light that he had never experienced in Japan. Since then, he remained in Paris for next 30 years and started his career as a photographer.

His first series of work “Ville (City)” (1973–1976) captured the unique light in Paris in black-and-white photography. His next series of work “Fenêtre (Windows)” (1973–1980) awarded the best new photographer by Arles International Photography Festival in 1977 and he moved into the limelight. The following year, he started the new series “Portrait” (1978), then “Eclat” (1979–1983) and ”Polaroid” (1984) and received number of awards such as Ihei Kimura award (1985).

His morphological approach to light has extended to sculpture, installations, and other various method crossing over the genre of photography. In 1993, in moat of the Castle of Angers (1993), the first light sculpture in France, "Fighting the Dragon” (1993) was installed.

"Garden of Light" (Eniwa, Hokkaido, 1989) is a representative piece in which light sculptures are installed in a public space covered in snow for six months of the year. The light changes in response to music and presents a space of poetic dimensions. Based on the same concept, "Échos du Lumières" (2000) was installed in the Canal Saint-Martin, commissioned as a public space project by the City of Paris. The spectacle colors from the prisms illuminate the stone wall synchronizing with the sounds.

The rest of his work include a permanent outdoor installation “Niwa (Garden)” (2001) at the Photography Museum in Paris (Maison Européenne de la Photographie), “Portail de Lumière”, an installation created as a part of the cultural project Lille 2004, and “ Light Sculpture” exhibition at Tokyo Metropolitan Teien Art Museum in 2004.

In 2008, Tahara lead the project of building Ginza 888, with the artistic direction of the Museum of Islamic Art. A photography book was published.

He continued to produce a number of light installation projects in urban spaces. He died on 6 June 2017.

== Awards ==
- 1977 Grand Prix des Rencontres Arles Photographie, France
- 1978 Prix Kodak de la Critique Photographique en France, France
- 1984 Japan Professional Photographers Society Prize, Japan
- 1985 Higashikawa Prize, Japan
- 1984 Kimura Ihei Award, Japan
- 1988 Prix Nicéphore Niépce, France
- 1989 ADC Prize, Japan
- 1990 Bourse Villa Medicis-Hors les murs, France
- 1993 Grand Prix de la Château Beychevelle, Franco-Japonaise, France
- 1993 Chevalier des Arts et des Lettres, France
- 1994 ADC Prize, Japan
- 1995 Grand Prix de la Ville de Paris, France
- 1999 Laureat Project, Vallée de la Chimie, Lyon, France
- 1999 Concours Festival Lumières, Lyon, France,
- 2003 Laureat Project, Vallée de la Chimie, Lyon, France
- 2003 Talents du luxe, prix de l’originalité, Paris, France
