= Toyoko Tokiwa =

Japanese photographer (1928–2019)

Toyoko Tokiwa (常盤 とよ子, Tokiwa Toyoko) (1928 – 24 December 2019) was a Japanese photographer best known for her 1957 book of text and photographs Kiken na Adabana (危険な毒花), and particularly for its portrayal of the red-light district of post-occupation Yokohama, with US servicemen.

== Life and career ==
Toyoko Tokiwa (常盤 トヨ子) was born in Yokohama in 1928. (Note: As stated in an Asahi Shinbun article cited above; additionally, the Kanagawa Shinbun Kanaroko article cited above states that she was 91 at the time of her death. However, Moriyama (Nihon shashinka jiten) says 15 January 1930. A birth year of 1930 is widely stated, even in at least one academic paper devoted to Tokiwa (三浦雅弘 (24 March 2014). "常盤とよ子の視線". 応用社会学研究. 56. Rikkyo University: 63–70.). 「常盤 とよ子」, pp.341–342 within 東京都写真美術館監修, 『現代写真人名事典』 (Tokyo: Nichigai Associates, 2005; ISBN 978-4-8169-1949-7), which might be expected to be authoritative, is silent about the year, let alone date, of birth. (An alternative, English-language title, Biographic Dictionary of Contemporary Japanese Photography, appears within the latter book, whose content is in Japanese only.)) (As a photographer, she would later spell "toyo" in hiragana rather than the original katakana. (Note: Source for 常盤 トヨ子 is 「常盤 とよ子」, pp.341–342 within 東京都写真美術館監修, 『現代写真人名事典』. Tokyo: Nichigai Associates, 2005. ISBN 978-4-8169-1949-7. In Nihon Shashinka Jiten (2000), Moriyama instead states that it was 常盤 刀洋子. As both books were edited under the supervision of the Tokyo Metropolitan Museum of Photography, it seems likely that the newer one was compiled with knowledge of the older one and thus that it is more reliable.)) Her family ran a liquor wholesaler at Kanagawa-dōri 4-chōme in Kanagawa-ku, Yokohama, where she lived until the building was burnt down in the American firebombing of 29 May 1945, an event in which her father sustained fatal burns. Her elder brother had used a Rolleicord camera and a darkroom, and this combined with a desire to work among men led Tokiwa to want to work as a photographer, even before she had used a camera herself.

Tokiwa graduated from Tokyo Kasei-Gakuin (the predecessor of Tokyo Kasei-Gakuin Junior College) in 1951. She started work as an announcer but dreamt of being a photographer instead, joining the women-only Shirayuri Camera Club (白百合カメラクラブ, Shirayuri Kamera Kurabu); she was influenced by the realism of Japanese photography at the time (led by Ken Domon).

Some of Tokiwa's earliest photographs are of Ōsanbashi, the pier in Yokohama at which American ships docked and that was thus the site of emotional partings and reunions of American military families. She was able to photograph close up without attracting any comment, and greatly enjoyed the work. But she quickly moved to her main interest, working women. Despite an initial hatred of the American military, prompted in particular by her father's death, and revulsion at prostitution, she simply invited herself into the akasen (red-light area) of Yokohama, asked the girls whether she might photograph, and was accepted.

Tokiwa would later marry an amateur photographer, Taikō Okumura (奥村泰宏, 1914–1995) – whose photography of postwar Japan appears with hers in a 1996 book – and work as both housewife and photojournalist.

She was a member of the Japan Professional Photographers Society and chaired the Kanagawa Prefectural Photographers Association (神奈川県写真作家協会, Kanagawa-ken shashin-sakka kyōkai).

=== Kiken na Adabana ===
Front cover of Tokiwa's 1957 book Kiken na Adabana. Tokiwa is holding a Canon rangefinder camera with Nikkor-P 8.5cm f/2 lens, superimposed on which is a detail of the final photograph within the book (p.226). The red obi, partly covering the black-and-white dust jacket, advertises 100 photographs.

In 1956 Tokiwa held an exhibition titled Hataraku Josei (働く女性, Working women) at the Konishiroku Photo Gallery (Tokyo) that won high acclaim. The exhibition showed pro wrestlers, models, ama, nurses and prostitutes.

In 1957, her book Kiken na Adabana (危険な毒花, literally "Dangerous Toxic/Fruitless Flowers"), (Note: The title of this book abounds in complications. The first (a trivial one) is that it appears as 危險な毒花 (with the older form of the character for ken) on the front and spine of the dust jacket and on the title page, but as 危険な毒花 (with the newer form) on the spine itself, the half title, the colophon, and the front of the obi. Secondly, the reading of the last two characters of the title is problematic. The book itself does not appear to specify the reading anywhere (even though its colophon gives the reading "Tokiwa"). Japanese dictionaries of Sino-Japanese do not include the combination 毒花; dictionaries of Japanese such as Kōjien do not list it under any of its more obvious readings: dokubana, dokuhana, dokuka or dokka. Accounts in Japanese of this book, such as Moriyama's piece in Nihon Shashinka Jiten or Nihon Shashinshi Gaisetsu (日本写真史概説; Tokyo: Iwanami Shoten, 1999; ISBN 4-00-008381-3) do not give the reading. Therefore somebody who has to provide a reading for the title will normally just guess or depend on others' guesses, and Kiken na Dokubana and Kiken na Kokuka are attested in OPACs, bibliographic databases and so forth. However, the "ruby" あだばな (i.e. adabana) is provided for the title in the potted chronology for Tokiwa on p.159 of Yokohama Saigen (see "Books by Tokiwa"), and it is highly unlikely that this was done without consultation with Tokiwa herself. Both Kōtarō Iizawa and Luisa Orto specify adabana, although without comment. Iizawa, "The evolution of postwar photography", in Anne Wilkes Tucker et al., The History of Japanese Photography (New Haven, CT: Yale University Press, 2003; ISBN 0-300-09925-8), p.217; Orto, "Toyoko Tokiwa", in Orto and Matsuda Takako, "Artist Profiles", in Tucker et al., p.364. The third problem is of how to gloss the title in English. Iizawa and Orto do so as "Dangerous fruitless flowers". Adabana indeed means "fruitless flower(s)", but it is normally written 徒花 and does not imply toxicity. By metaphorical extension, it can mean "prostitute(s)". Adabana is sometimes written 仇花, in which the character for ada means "harm" or "malice" (in addition to "enemy", etc.). Meanwhile, the character 毒 does mean "toxicity". Thus the title means "Dangerous Fruitless Flowers", "Dangerous Prostitutes", "Dangerous Toxic Flowers", or similar.) was published by Mikasa Shobō. Its text is divided into three parts:

- Kiken na adabana (as explained above)
- Fāsutofurekkusu kara Kyanon made (i.e. "From Firstflex to Canon"; the Firstflex was a brand of twin-lens reflex camera made by Tokiwa Seiki, 常盤精機)
- Kōfuku e no iriguchi no aru ie (i.e. "A House with an Entrance to Happiness")

Each of these is further subdivided into short essays. The text is in the first person and often about Tokiwa herself: the (composite) cover photograph and the photograph in the frontispiece both show Tokiwa holding a Canon rangefinder camera, in a period when photography was very much a male pursuit in Japan. (Note: "Until the 1980s there were few successful female photographers [in Japan]." Anne Wilkes Tucker, "Introduction", Tucker et al., p.12. Tucker then mentions and alludes to several who preceded Tokiwa.)

The text of the book is interrupted by four sections of photographs, taken between 1952 and 1957 (captions and technical data appear on pp. 242–241 (Note: Not a mistake; as this is a two-page island of horizontal writing within a book whose text is otherwise vertical, it is paginated backwards.)). There is a title on the first photograph of each; these are:

- Aru machi no kurai onna no iru fūkei (i.e. "The dark scenery with Women of a certain Japanese town"). Mostly street scenes within this town (Yokohama) many showing girls and US servicemen. On pp. 44–45 appears Tokiwa's most famous photograph, (Note: This is reprinted in for example Iizawa, "The evolution of postwar photography", in Tucker et al., p.236.) taken in Wakaba-chō Bā-gai (若葉町バー街, bar street), behind Isezakichō, showing a girl held down by a foreign man while another in uniform looks away.
- Kiken na hakimono (i.e. "Dangerous footwear"). The opening photograph shows geta and sandals discarded at the entrance to a hospital; the photographs that follow show girls waiting for or having injections and mandatory checks of freedom from venereal diseases.
- Fāsutofurekkusu kara Kyanon made (as explained above). A complex series: foreign visitors to Japan, ama, nude modelling, and chindon'ya.
- Kōfuku e no iriguchi no aru ie (as explained above). Happier scenes of young women – although the series ends with the scene shown within the lens on the cover.

Kōtarō Iizawa calls the book "the strongest, most compassionate work by female photographer of that era."

=== Television work ===
From 1962 to 1965 Tokiwa produced the television series Hataraku Josei-tachi (働く女性たち, Working women).

=== Other photography and publications ===
Tokiwa photographed around US military bases in Yokosuka (1958) and the Ryūkyū islands (1960), the Soviet Union (1974, and Taiwan and Malaysia (1975–80). Since 1985, she worked on issues involving the elderly.

No book has yet (early 2010) been devoted to the later work of Tokiwa, but from the 1950s until the 1970s her work appeared in the magazines Asahi Camera, Camera Mainichi, Nippon Camera, Sankei Camera, and Shashin Salon.

In November 2010, when she spoke (on the 23rd) to the Japan Professional Photographers Society's 60th anniversary photo exhibition "Women" in Yokohama to an audience of about a hundred on her early days as a photographer, she was living in Yokohama and working on photographing people with Alzheimer's disease.

=== Other work ===
In 1967 Tokiwa joined a committee choosing work for exhibition by Kanagawa Prefecture, and in 1987 she taught at Fujisawa Bunka Sentā (Fujisawa, Kanagawa).

== Exhibitions ==
In 1957, Tokiwa joined Tōmatsu, Narahara and others in the first exhibition of Jūnin no Me (10人の目, The Eyes of Ten). Until 1960, Tokiwa presented her work in several exhibitions, at least once together with Hisae Imai.

The 3rd Month of Photography Tokyo showcased a variety of photograph exhibitions at various galleries in Tokyo in 1998. The main theme was "The Eye of Women Photographers" (Josei Shashinka no Manazashi), and it exhibited photographs by Tokiwa and other established Japanese women photographers of the 1945–1997 period.

Tokiwa joined the Yokohama Photo Triangle exhibition in 2009, held as a part of the 150th anniversary of the opening of the port of Yokohama, where she also organized a civic participation program.

== Permanent collections ==
- Tokyo Metropolitan Museum of Photography. (Note: As implied by her inclusion, without a qualifying note, within the book Nihon Shashinka Jiten / 328 Outstanding Japanese Photographers.)
- Yamaguchi Prefectural Museum of Art.
- Yokohama Civic Art Gallery.

== Books by Tokiwa ==
- Kiken na Adabana (危険な毒花). Tokyo: Mikasa Shobō, 1957. (in Japanese)
- With Taikō Okumura (奥村泰宏). Sengo 50-nen: Yokohama Saigen: Futari de Utsushita Haisen Sutōrī (戦後50年 横浜再現 二人で写した敗戦ストーリー). (Note: Another problematic title. All three ingredients appear on the cover, the title page, and the colophon, but the question of which way around they should go is unclear. In this list, they follow the order in the colophon.) Tokyo: Heibonsha, 1996. ISBN 4-582-27733-0. (in Japanese) Photographs of Yokohama after the war; pp. 3–95 show Okumura's work, pp. 96–143 show Tokiwa's.
- Watashi no Naka no Yokohama Densetsu: Tokiwa Toyoko Shashinshū 1954–1956 (わたしの中のヨコハマ伝説 常盤とよ子写真集 1954–1956) / A Collection of Photographs by Toyoko Tokiwa. Yokohama: Tokiwa Toyoko Shashin Jimusho, 2001. (in Japanese) Photographs of Yokohama, 1954–56.
