= Tokyo Kasei-Gakuin Junior College =

- 東京家政学院短期大学
- Type: Private university
- Established: 1950
- Location: Chiyoda, Tokyo, Japan
- Campus: Chiyoda Sanbanchō Campus 35°41′29.3″N 139°44′32″E Machida Campus 35°36′32.4″N 139°18′42.4″E
- Website: http://www.kasei-gakuin.ac.jp/index.shtml

Tokyo Kasei-Gakuin Junior College (東京家政学院短期大学, Tōkyō kasei gakuin tanki daigaku) is a private women's college in Chiyoda, Tokyo, Japan, established in 1950. The predecessor of the school was founded in 1925.

Though the two share the same historical roots (and the website), this school and Tokyo Kasei-Gakuin University are distinct institutions.

== Alumnae ==
- Toyoko Tokiwa, photographer
