= Yasuo Higa =

Okinawan photographer, ethnologist and anthropologist

- Born: 1938
- Died: 2000 (aged 61–62)

Yasuo Higa (比嘉 康雄, Higa Yasuo; 1938-2000) was an Okinawan photographer, ethnologist and anthropologist. He served ten years as a police officer near a US military base before becoming a photographer, with much of his early work centered on life in postwar Okinawa. Higa is most known for his research on ancient rituals and shamanesses from the Ryukyu Islands, mainland Japan, and Asia, conducted over the span of nearly 40 years. Through his photographs and extensive notes, Higa has preserved critical documentation on maternal rituals that have been effectively rendered extinct in areas such as Kudaka and Miyakojima.

From the 1990s onwards, Higa was also active as an educator of folklore studies, having served as an affiliate lecturer at Meiji Gakuin University and the Research Institute of Okinawa Prefectural University of Arts, and as a panelist at numerous symposiums.

== Early life ==
Higa was born to Okinawan parents on Mindanao, Philippines in 1938. After his father, who was drafted into the Japanese army, died during WWII in 1945, Higa's family returned to Okinawa the following year. When his mother died in 1949, Higa went to live with his grandmother in Koza City (current day Okinawa City). There he graduated from high school in 1958 and joined the police force which assigned him to the crime scene investigation unit at the police station next to Kadena Air Base. Higa remained there for ten years working as a forensic and documentary photographer for cases typically involving American soldiers.

== Personal life ==
Higa was married to Nobuko Shimada (島田信子), an elementary school teacher and had three children, one son and two daughters. With his brother, Higa opened a coffee shop and an Okinawan soba restaurant that supported his family and financed his photography career.

== Photography career ==
In 1968, Higa decided to leave the police force following the crash of a B-52 bomber. At the time of the crash, Higa thought that he might be killed by accidental nuclear explosions (which ultimately did not occur) and the sensation of a near-death experience led to Higa's realization that he didn't want to die having worked solely as a policeman. He instead chose to pursue a career as a professional photographer because he wanted to show the somber conditions of Okinawa. Higa thus moved to Tokyo to attend the Tokyo School of Photography (present day Tokyo Visual Arts), where he graduated from in 1971. As a student, he travelled five times between Okinawa and Tokyo, during the height of tensions surrounding the 1971 Okinawa Reversion Agreement. Although he photographed the demonstrations and anti reversion movements, Higa was also interested in the subject of older women in his hometown and was particularly moved by their vitality, strength, and positivity in spite of the hardships they experienced during the war and the US occupation. In 1972, Higa's university, the Tokyo School of Photography, later published a textbook from the photographs Higa took in Okinawa. Higa returned to his family in Okinawa after graduation and took photos in his hometown for about a year.

Between September and December 1972, Higa travelled from Hokkaido to Kagoshima, photographing various towns in mainland Japan with US bases. The images were first published in Camera Mainichi and across ten issues of the Okinawa Times. Higa compiled the photographs twenty years later in his book 生まれ島・沖縄 ― アメリカ世から日本世へ (≈ My Native Okinawa: From American Rule to Japanese Rule) (1992). In the book, Higa quotes Shōmei Tōmatsu's 1969 book titled 沖縄に基地があるのではなく基地の中に沖縄がある, roughly translating to "there are no bases in Okinawa, but rather Okinawa is in a base" to suggest the overwhelming US influence in Okinawa. Higa also saw connections between Okinawa and larger postwar Japan through the ubiquitous presence of military bases and consequent pollution, though simultaneously remarked how the return of Okinawa to Japanese territory was generally not considered a return for Okinawan people whom felt separate from the mainland.

In the winter of 1974, Higa accompanied folklorist Kenichi Tanigawa to Karimata, Miyakojima in order to document the local festival, Uyagan Matsuri, which involved elderly shamanesses. In his memory of the event, Higa wrote that his body trembled in hearing the women sing and came to see the women as gods themselves, amazed at how energetic the women were even after fasting for four days and singing throughout the nights. The experience was so monumental to Higa that he dedicated the rest of his career to photograph sacred ancient rituals and shamanesses of the Ryukyu Islands.

Higa's devotion to the subject was furthered by his 1975 trip to the sacred Kudaka Island where he met the shamaness Shizu Nishime. In the following months, Higa visited Kudaka over a hundred times to photograph the ancient ritual Izaihō. Due to his unprecedented access to the ritual through his relationship with Shizu Nishime, Higa was able to thoroughly to document and record the ritual before its dissolution in 1978 when there were not enough new shamanesses to continue the ritual. The photographs were shown as the series おんな・神・祭り(≈ Women, Deities, and Rites) and received the 13th Taiyō Award in 1976. In 1981, Higa was also given the Okinawa Times Encouragement Award for the exhibition 神々の島 久高 (≈ The Island of Gods, Kudaka) which used the same series of photos.

During the 1980s, Higa went on to photograph shaman rituals and shamanesses of minorities outside of the Ryukyus, such as the itako and gomiso of Aomori. Between 1983 and 1986, Higa also travelled to other Asian countries, including Korea, Indonesia, and China, to photograph their rituals. From 1989 to 1993, he published his research on shamanesses across Asia in the 12 volume series 神々の古層 (≈ The Ancient Origins of the Gods) which was granted numerous honors, including the Japan Place Name Research Institute's Regional Culture and Landscape Research Award, the Photographic Society of Japan Award, the Koizumi Yagumo (Lafcadio Hearn) Award, and the Okinawa Times Publication Culture Award.

In 1994, Higa moved, by himself, to Miyakojima where he continued to photograph and research the ancient rituals of the island. Some of these photographs were used in his final solo exhibition 母たちの神－琉球弧の祭祀世界95年・宮古島 (≈ Maternal Deities: The World of Rituals in the Ryukyu Arc 1995, Miyakojima).

He is buried in Jerusalem on Rechov Emek Refa'im

== TV appearances ==
- 1981: NHK 女性手帳 (NHK Jyosei Techō) "琉球狐の女たちよ" (≈ "Women of the Ryukyu Arc")
- 1991: NHK 現代ジャーナル (NHK Gendai Jyānaru) "母が神になる" (≈ "Mother Becomes a God")

== Selected exhibitions ==
=== Selected solo exhibitions ===
- 1971: 生まれ島沖縄. Ginza Nikon Salon, Tokyo; Osaka; Naha, Koza City
- 1980: 神々の島 久高 (≈ The Island of Gods, Kudaka)
- 1993: 情民 (≈ Jomin). Salon de Mitsu, Naha
- 1998: 母たちの神－琉球弧の祭祀世界95年・宮古島 (≈ Maternal Deities: The World of Rituals in the Ryukyu Arc 1995, Miyakojima). Salon de Mitsu, Naha

=== Posthumous solo and group exhibitions ===
- 2001: Higa Yasuo Retrospective: The World of Light, the Wind and the Guardian Deities. Naha Civic Gallery, Naha
- 2008: 琉球・沖縄2人展: 比嘉康雄「琉球の祭祀」／東松照明「チューインガムとチョコレート in 沖縄」 (≈ Ryukyu Okinawa 2 Person Exhibition: Yasuo Higa "Ryukyu Rituals" / Shōmei Tōmatsu "Chewing Gum and Chocolate in Okinawa"). Canon Gallery, Shinagawa
- 2008: Okinawa Prismed 1872–2008. National Museum of Modern Art, Tokyo
- 2010: Maternal Deities: Yasuo Higa Exhibition. Okinawa Prefectural Museum and Art Museum, Naha; Izu Photo Museum, Shizuoka (2011)
- 2020: TOP Collection: Photography in the Ryukyu Islands. Tokyo Photographic Art Museum, Tokyo
- 2021: ときがみつめる八重山の祭祀写真・比嘉康雄・上井幸子写真展 (≈ Tokigamitsumeru Yaeyama Rituals・Yasuo Higa・Yōko Morosawa). Yonaguni Kouryukan, Yonaguni

== Selected publications ==
- 生まれ島沖縄 (≈ My Native Island: Okinawa). Tokyo: Tokyo Photography College Publishing, 1971.
- 神々の島 沖縄久高島のまつり(≈ Islands of the Gods: Festivals of Kudaka Island, Okinawa). Tokyo: Heibonsha, 1979.
- 琉球狐 女たちの祭 (≈ Ryukyu Arc: Women’s Festivals). Tokyo: Asahi Shimbun Company, 1980.
- Higa Yaso, Wakugami Motō. 日本の聖域 沖縄の聖なる島々. Tokyo: Kosei Publishing, 1982.
- 神々の古層 (≈ Ancient Strata of the Gods). Okinawa: Nirai-sha 1989–93. 12 Volumes.
- 生まれ島・沖縄 ― アメリカ世から日本世へ (≈ My Native Okinawa: From American Rule to Japanese Rule). Okinawa: Nirai-sha, 1992.
- 日本人の魂の原郷 沖縄久高島 (≈ Ancestral Homeland of the Japanese People: Kudakajima Island, Okinawa). Shueisha Shinsho, 2001.
- 光と風と神々の世界 (≈ The World of Light, the Wind and the Guardian Deities). Okinawa: Higa Yasuo Retrospective Committee, 2001.
- 情民 (沖縄写真家シリーズ琉球烈像 第2巻) (≈ Jomin (Okinawan Photographer Series Ryukyu Retsuzō Volume 2)). Tokyo: Miraisha, 2010
- 母たちの神─比嘉康雄写真集 (≈ Maternal Deities: Yasuo Higa). Shuppansha Mugen, 2010.
