= Bun'yō Ishikawa =

Japanese photographer and photojournalist (1938–2026)

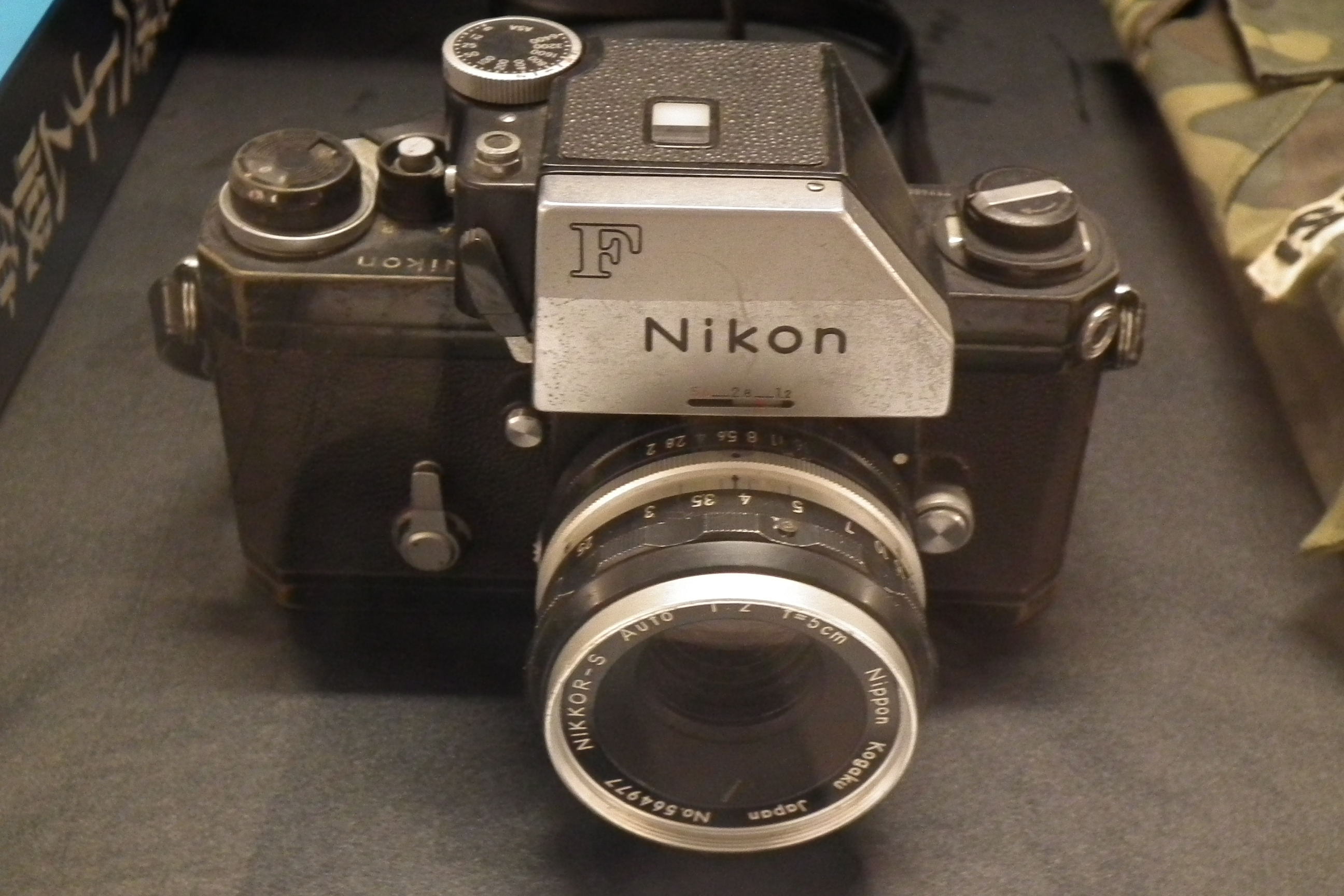
Nikon F used in the Vietnam War by Ishikawa

Bun'yō Ishikawa (石川 文洋, Ishikawa Bun'yō; March 10, 1938 – August 23, 2026) was a Japanese photographer.

Ishikawa was stationed in Saigon and covered the Vietnam War as a photojournalist from 1964 to 1968. He worked as a staff photographer for Asahi Shimbun from 1969 to 1984. After 1984 he worked as a freelance photographer. After 1984, Ishikawa continued to photograph in conflict zones around the world but also is known for photographs of daily life, portraits, and Ryukyu Dance.

In 1998, Ishikawa donated about 250 photographs with a focus on the Vietnam War to become part of a permanent exhibition at the Vietnam War Remnants Museum in Ho Chi Minh City. Ishikawa donated about 270 photographs to the Okinawa City "Material Culture after World War II" exhibition room to become a permanent exhibition.

Ishikawa died from lymphoma in Nagano Prefecture on August 23, 2026, at the age of 88.

== Books ==
- Forefront of Vietnam, 1967, Yomiuri Shimbun
- This is the Vietnam War (Photograph Book), 1967, Yomiuri Shimbun
- The Vietnam War and the People, 1971, Asahi Shinbunsha
- Photo Reportage. North Vietnam, 1973, Asahi Shinbunsha
- Chien Tranh Giai Phong Viet Nam, 1977
- War and Man: Photo Document Vietnam, 1989, Sowa Shuppan

== Exhibitions ==
- "War, Soldiers, and People" (1970)
- "North Vietnam" (1973)
- "South Yemen" (1978)
- "People and Angkor in Cambodia" (1981)
- "Ryukyu Dance" (1983)
- "North Korea" (1984)
- "Age of Discovery" (1987)
- "One Year of Fukae-Fugen" (1994)
- "Illusion of Venice" (1994)
- "35 Years Reporting War and Peace in Vietnam" (1998)
- "War and American Bases in Okinawa" (2000)
- "30-year Return of Okinawa" (2002)
- "65-year-old challenge: Walking Journey across Japan" (2004)
- "Smile in the World" (2007)
- "Place over Shikoku Eighty-eight" (2009)

== Awards ==
- Photographic Society of Japan award year (1973)
- Press Photographers Association Awards Japan Magazine (1982, 1983)
- Special Award Japan Congress of Journalists (JCJ) (1990)
- Award / Sweden Prize civic culture Ichikawa (1997)
- Business Achievement Award from the Vietnamese government of Culture and Communication (2005)
