= Toshio Yamane =

Japanese photographer

Toshio Yamane (山根 敏郎, Yamane Toshio; born 1953) is a Japanese photographer known for his depictions of the juxtaposition of man-made structures on natural topography.

== Early life ==
Yamane was born on 29 June 1953 in what is now Iwaki, Fukushima Prefecture, Japan. He studied German literature at Sophia University, graduating in 1977 and thereafter working at Asahi Shinbunsha (the publisher of Asahi Shimbun) until 1988, when he went freelance.

== Career ==
Yamane's color photographs of the waterfront of Tokyo Bay, taken on 4×5 film, were exhibited at the Nikon Salon in 1986 and Gallery Min in 1989, and published in book form as Front in 1991. The book won Yamane a newcomer's prize in the 42nd PSJ awards in 1992.

Yamane's photographs were exhibited with those by Yūji Saiga, Naoya Hatakeyama and Norio Kobayashi in an exhibition, Land of Paradox, that travelled around the US in 1996–97.

== Books ==
- Ashiya City Museum of Art and History (芦屋市立美術館, Ashiya-shi Bijutsukan). Rando obu paradokkusu (ランド・オブ・パラドックス) / Land of Paradox. Kyoto: Tankōsha, 1997. ISBN 4-473-01549-1.
- Front. Tokyo: Jōhō Sentā Shuppankyoku, 1991. ISBN 4-7958-0563-6. Devoted to Yamane's works.
- Fuku, Noriko, ed. Land of paradox: Yuji Saiga, Naoya Hatakeyama, Norio Kobayashi, Toshio Yamane. Daytona Beach, Fla: Daytona Beach Community College, 1996. ISBN 1-887040-16-1. Catalogue of the exhibition as held in the US.
