= Hiroji Kubota =

Japanese photographer

Hiroji Kubota (久保田 博二, Kubota Hiroji; born 2 August 1939) is a Japanese photographer, a member of Magnum Photos who has specialized in photographing the far east.

== Biography ==
Born in Kanda (Tokyo), Kubota studied politics at Waseda University, graduating in 1962. In 1961 he met the Magnum photographers René Burri, Elliott Erwitt, and Burt Glinn. He then studied journalism and international politics at the University of Chicago, and became an assistant to Erwitt and Cornell Capa, in 1965, a freelance photographer.

Kubota photographed the 1968 US presidential election and then Ryūkyū islands before their return to Japan in 1972. He then photographed Saigon in 1975, North Korea in 1978, and China in 1979–85, and the USA in 1988–92, resulting in books and exhibitions.

Kubota won the Mainichi Art Prize in 1980, and the Annual Award of the Photographic Society of Japan in 1981. Three of his publications won him the first Kodansha Publishing Culture Award in 1970: "Black People", and essays on Calcutta and the Ryūkyū islands.

During the 1980s, Kubota utilized a diverse range of photographic equipment. For 35mm format, he relied on Leica M4-2, Nikon FM2, and Olympus OM-2 cameras. For his panoramic work, he employed two custom-made Fuji cameras in 8x20-inch and 2 1/4x7-inch formats. His photography primarily utilized Fujichrome transparency films (ISO 50 and 100), as well as custom-cut Fujicolor NS 100 negative film.

== Exhibitions by Kubota ==
- "The President's People." Neikrug Gallery (New York), 1976.
- 静思のビルマ. Nikon Salon (Tokyo), 1976.
- "Daigan no nagare" (大河の流れ). Odakyu Department Store, 1976.
- "Keirin mugen" (桂林夢幻). Matsuya (Ginza), 1982.
- "On China." ICP (New York), 1982.
- "Chūgoku mange" (中国万華). Matsuya (Ginza), 1986.
- "Korea: Above the 38th Parallel." ICP (New York), 1986.
- "Magnum en Chine" The Rencontres d'Arles festival, Arles, France, 1988.
- "China." Tokyo Fuji Art Museum (Tokyo), 1991
- "From Sea to Shining Sea: A Portrait of America." Corcoran Gallery of Art (Washington, D.C.), 1992
- "Out of the East: Recent Photographs of Asia." Equitable Gallery (New York), 1997
- "China: Fifty Years inside the People's Republic." Asia Society (New York), 1999–2000
- "Can We Feed Ourselves?" Asia Society (New York); School of Oriental and African Studies (London), 2001/2002
- "USA 1963–69 and Burma 1970–78." Photo Gallery International (Shibaura, Tokyo), 2009.

== Books by Kubota ==
- Daigan no nagare: Chūgoku no fūdo to ningen (大河の流れ 中国の風土と人間). Tokyo: PPS, 1980. (in Japanese) Exhibition catalogue.
- Daigan no nagare: Chūgoku no fūdo to ningen (大河の流れ 中国の風土と人間). Tokyo: Geibunsha, 1981. (in Japanese)
- Keirin mugen (桂林夢幻). Tokyo: Iwanani Shoten, 1982. (in Japanese)
- Yūkyū no daichi Chūgoku: 5000-nen no rekishi o yuku (悠久の大地中国 5000年の歴史を行く). Higashi Murayama: Kyōikusha, 1985. ISBN 4-315-50183-2. (in Japanese)
- Kōzan senkyū (黄山仙境). Tokyo: Iwanami Shoten, 1985. ISBN 4-00-008026-1. (in Japanese)
- China. Hamburg: Hoffmann und Campe, 1985. ISBN 3-455-08258-0. (in German)
- Chūgoku mange (中國万華). Tokyo: PPS, 1986. (in Japanese) Exhibition catalogue.
- Chūgoku mange (中国万華). Tokyo: TBS Britannica, 1986. ISBN 4-484-86203-4. (in Japanese)
- Chine. [Neuilly-sur-Seine]: [Ed. Hologramme], 1987. (in French)
- Zhongguo feng wu (中國風物). Hong Kong: San lian shu dian Xianggang fen dian, 1987. ISBN 962-04-0393-2. (in Chinese)
- Chōsen 38-dosen no kita (朝鮮三十八度線の北). Higashi Murayama: Kyōikusha, 1988. ISBN 4-315-50759-8. (in Japanese)
- Chōsen meihō Hakutōsan Kongōsan (朝鮮名峰白頭山金剛山). Tokyo: Iwanami Shoten, 1988. ISBN 4-00-008041-5. (in Japanese)
- Chine: Photos de Hiroji Kubota. Paris: École nationale supérieure des Beaux-Arts, 1988. (in French)
- Pungnyŏk ŭi sanha: Kubotʻa Hiroji sajinjip: Paektusan, Kŭmgangsan (북녘의산하: 구보타히로지사진집: 백두산 금강산). Seoul: Hanʼgyŏre Sinmunsa, 1988. (in Korean)
- Shinpen keirin mugen (新編桂林夢幻). Tokyo: Iwanami, 1990. ISBN 4-00-260046-7. (in Japanese)
- Shinpen Kōzan shinkyū (新編黄山仙境). Tokyo: Iwanami Shoten, 1991. ISBN 4-00-260068-8. (in Japanese)
- Haruka naru daichi Chūgoku (遥かなる大地中国). Hachiōji: Tokyo Fuji Bijutsukan, 1991. (in Japanese)
- Amerika no shōzō (アメリカの肖像). Tokyo: Shūeisha, 1992. ISBN 4-08-532043-2. (in Japanese)
- From Sea to Shining Sea: A Portrait of America. New York: Norton, 1992. ISBN 0-393-03410-0. (in English)
- Amerika: ein Porträt. Hamburg: Hoffmann und Campe, 1992. ISBN 3-455-08454-0. (in German)
- Ichiban tōi kuni: Kita Chōsen annai (いちばん遠い国・北朝鮮案内). Tokyo: Takarajima, 1994: ISBN 4-7966-0846-X. (in Japanese)
- China. New York: Norton, 1995. ISBN 0-393-02243-9. (in English)
- Ajia to shokuryō (アジアと食料) / Can We Feed Ourselves? Tokyo: Ie no Hikari Kyōkai, 1999. ISBN 4-259-54566-3. (in Japanese) The captions specify the place in both Japanese and English but the explanatory text is in Japanese only.
- Can We Feed Ourselves? A Focus on Asia. New York: Magnum, 1999. ISBN 0-914122-00-2. (in English)
- Out of the East: Transition and Tradition in Asia. New York: Norton, 1999. ISBN 0-393-04088-7. (in English)
- Japan. New York: Norton, 2005. ISBN 0-393-05843-3. (in English)
