= Shigeru Tamura (photographer) =

Japanese photographer

- 田村茂
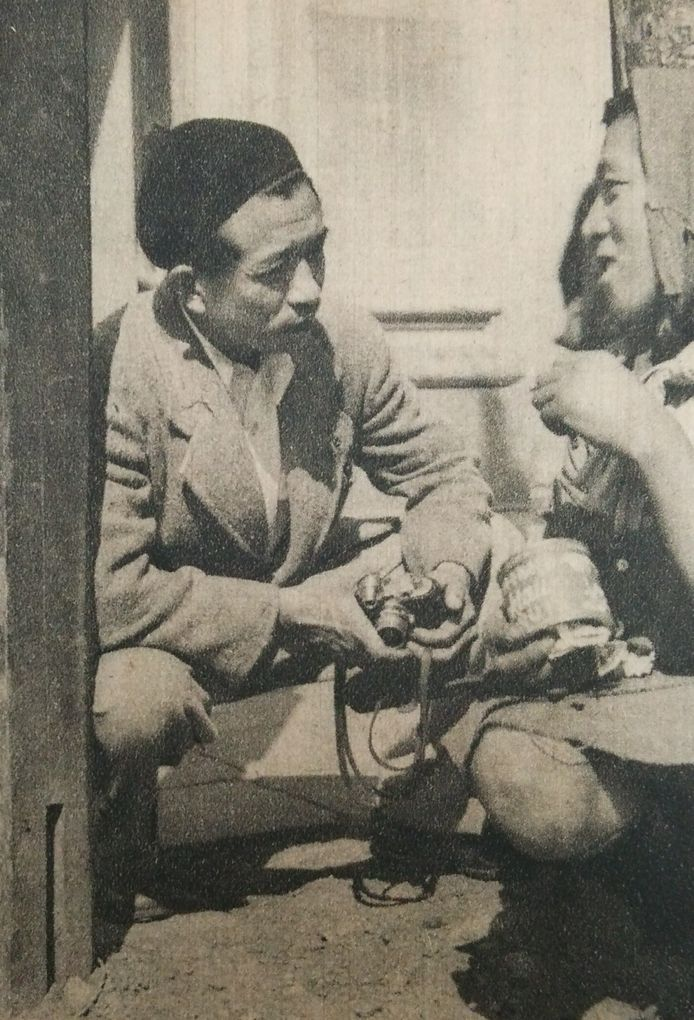
- circa 1948
- Born: 田村寅重; 28 February 1909; Japan, Sapporo, Hokkaido
- Died: 16 December 1987 (aged 78)
- Occupation: photojournalist
- Known for: creator of the portrait of Osamu Dazai

Shigeru Tamura (田村 茂, Tamura Shigeru; 28 February 1909 – 16 December 1987) was a Japanese photographer notable for his work in fashion and photojournalism.

Tamura was born in Sapporo, Hokkaidō. Shigeru was an assumed name; Tamura's personal name was probably Torashige. He studied photography at the Oriental School of Photography (オリエンタル写真学校, Orientaru Shashin Gakkō); graduating in 1929. With Yoshio Watanabe, in 1935 he set up a studio for advertising and other photography in Ginza, Tokyo. He was highly successful as a fashion photographer, notably in work for the magazine Fujin Gahō from 1937. Together with Ken Domon, Hiroshi Hamaya, and other photographers, Tamura helped found the Young People's Photojournalism Research Society (Seinen Hōdō Shashin Kenkyūkai) in 1938 with the support of Photo Times.

Tamura emerged from the war as a photographer of social issues in Japan, approaching them from a pacifist and left-wing angle. He also traveled, producing books on the Arab world and North Vietnam. In 1963 he set up the Japan Realist Photographers Association (Nihon Riarizumu Shashin Shūdan).

In the 1970s Tamura documented the topography and cultural patrimony of Japan. He died in 1987.

== Note ==
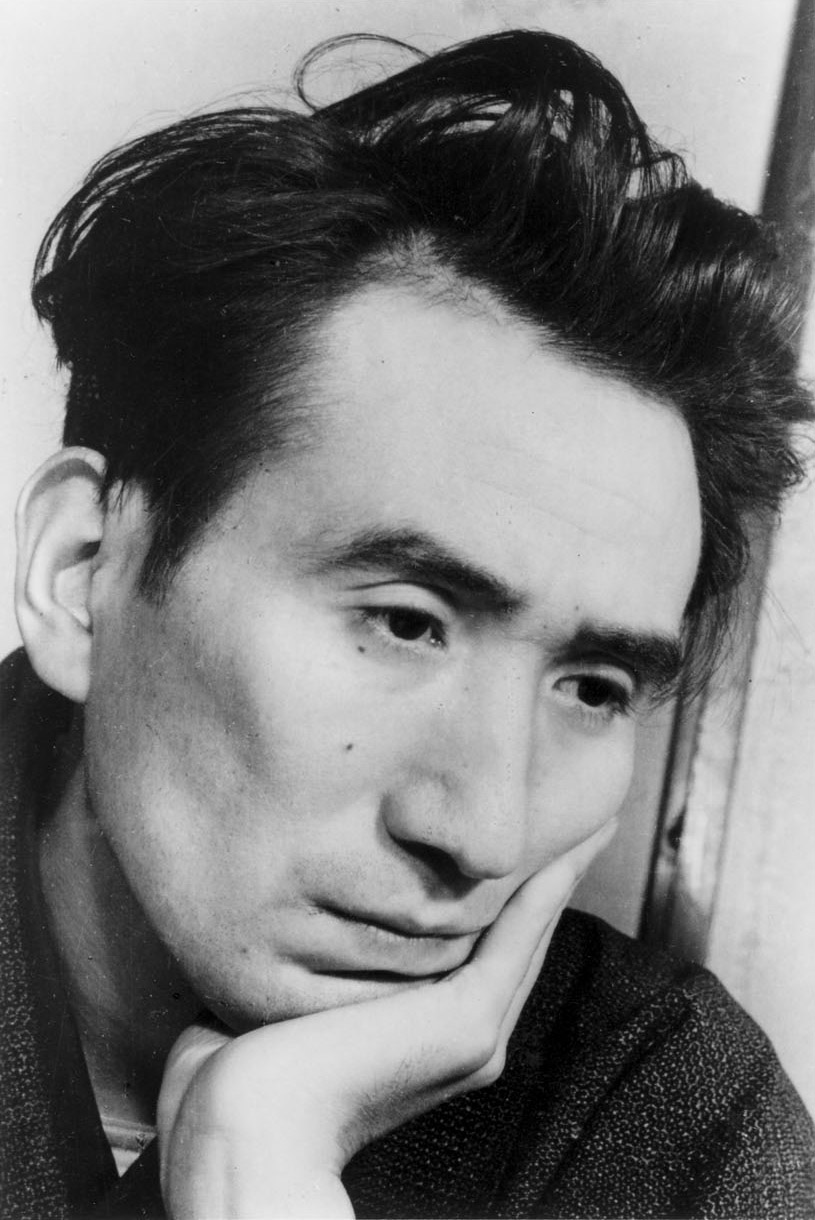
A portrait by Tamura of Osamu Dazai.

== Books by Tamura ==
- Gendai Nihon no hyakunin (現代日本の百人). Tokyo: Bungei Shunju, 1953.
- Arabu no shinjitsu (アラブの真実). Text by Kai Shizuma (甲斐静馬). Tokyo: Chikuma Shobō, 1958.
- Kita Betonamu no shōgen: Mina koroshi sakusen no jittai (北ベトナムの証言：みな殺し作戦の実態). Tokyo: Shin Nihon Shuppansha, 1967.
- Minna ga eiyū: Shashin de miru Kita-Betonamu hōkoku (みんなが英雄：写真で見る「北ベトナム報告」). Tokyo: Mainichi Shinbunsha, 1965.
- Chibetto (チベット). Tokyo: Kenkōsha, 1966.
- Nihon no fūdo to bunka (日本の風土と文化). Tokyo: Kenkōsha, 1976.
- (in Japanese) Waga kamera no sengoshi (わがカメラの戦後史, My postwar photographic story). Tokyo: Shin Nihon Shuppansha, 1982. A survey of Tamura's work.
- Tamura Shigeru no shashin jinsei (田村茂の写真人生). Tokyo: Shin Nihon Shuppansha, 1986. ISBN 4-406-01369-5.
- Gudō no shashinka Tamura Shigeru (求道の写真家・田村茂). Tokyo: Kōyō Shuppansha, 1990. ISBN 4-87662-058-X.

== Sources and links ==
- (in Japanese) Nihon shashinka jiten (日本写真家事典) / 328 Outstanding Japanese Photographers. Kyoto: Tankōsha, 2000. ISBN 4-473-01750-8
- (in Japanese) Shashinka 100-nin: Kao to sakuhin (写真家100人：顔と作品) / 100 photographers, profiles and photographs. Special 20th anniversary supplement to Camera Mainichi, 1974.
- Shigeru Tamura at PhotoGuide Japan

Media related to Shigeru Tamura at Wikimedia Commons
