= Naoki Ishikawa (photographer) =

Alpinist and mountaineer

Personal information

Climbing career
- Type of climber: High altitude mountaineer
- Major ascents: Mount Everest (2001) Shishapangma (2024)
- Known for: First Japanese man to climb all 14 eight-thousanders and the Seven Summits

Naoki Ishikawa (石川 直樹, Ishikawa Naoki; b. Tokyo, 1977) is a Japanese photographer and mountaineer. He has climbed all 14 eight-thousanders and the seven summits. In 2001, he began to take photographs seriously and thereafter his ventures as a photographer and writer have intimately linked to his travels and climbs, as he often photographs and writes about his own adventures to various remote landscapes. Ishikawa's analog photographs frequently capture nature at its most extreme and the people that inhabit it, gaining a broad recognition for his ethnographic sensibility and curiosity, informed by his study of anthropology and ethnography at Waseda University.

Ishikawa actively participates in the education of photography and anthropology; he has served as a part-time lecturer at the Faculty of Sociology at Rikkyo University and the Photography department of Nihon University and is currently the director of the Photo Archipelago Setouchi school.

== Early life and education ==
Ishikawa was raised in Hatsudai, Tokyo. His grandfather was the author and literary critic Jun Ishikawa. Throughout his childhood he attended the Catholic Gyosei International School in Chiba. Ishikawa's developed a craving for exploration early in his elementary school years, reading adventure and expedition books on his long commute by train to school. By his teenage years, Ishikawa was traveling to distant prefectures on weekends to hike with friends or camp outdoors by himself. In his second year of high school, Ishikawa made his first solo trip abroad to India and Nepal. Ishikawa’s interest in the outdoors led him to attend rallies raising awareness of environmental issues as a high school student. During one of these rallies, he became connected to the writer and canoeist Tomosuke Noda. Noda advocated that Ishikawa go to university when Ishikawa had expressed interest in becoming a newspaper reporter or journalist and the following year, he enrolled at Waseda University.

Ishikawa received his bachelor's degree from Waseda University in 2002 with a specialization in anthropology and ethnography. He received his MFA in 2005 and later his Ph.D. in 2008, both at the Tokyo University of the Arts.

== Mountaineering ==
Ishikawa began high altitude climbing in his early twenties and quickly became an established climber internationally – at the age of 23, he became the youngest person to reach all seven summits by 2001 (no longer the record holder). His first ascent was Denali in 1998 and within the next year he reached the summits of both Mount Elbrus and Kilimanjaro on solo trips. In 2000, Ishikawa was selected by Martyn S. Williams to participate in the Pole to Pole project: a 9 month expedition which consisted of 8 young people from 5 different continents that traveled 32,970 km from the North Pole to the South Pole. At the end of the trip, Ishikawa stayed in Antarctica and climbed Vinson Massif in January 2001. Within the same year he climbed Aconcagua in Argentina, then to Puncak Jaya in Oceania, and finally to the North face of Mount Everest to complete the seven summits.

Ishikawa has returned to the Himalayas repeatedly throughout his climbing career; each year between 2011 and 2019, he has either successfully summited a mountain on the Himalayas or attempted to. In May 2011, he summited Mount Everest for the second time through the Southeast ridge. In May 2012, he attempted to climb Lhotse (in Nepal) but had to withdraw midway due to landslides and dangerous climbing conditions. Later that year, Ishikawa summited Manaslu. In May 2013, he reattempted Lhotse and was able to reach the summit. In May 2014, he climbed Makalu in Nepal. In 2015, Ishikawa attempted K2 in Pakistan and the nearby Broad Peak, but had to withdraw from both mountains because of avalanches. In November 2018, he climbed Ama Dablam in Nepal and in July 2019, he climbed Gasherbrum II in Pakistan. Ishikawa's dedication to the Himalayas can be attributed to his view of the mountains as a "school" where the beautiful, yet harsh, conditions enable him to develop a greater sense of consciousness and appreciation. His affinity for the actual process of climbing mountains with such immense heights can also be attributed to the sensation, as described by Ishikawa, of "being reborn."

In 2024, he climbed his final eight-thousander, Shishapangma, reaching the summit on October 4.

== Photography ==
Ishikawa began photography seriously during the Pole to Pole expedition in 2001. He was prompted by a newspaper editor to shoot at least one roll of film per day and keep notes so that they could publish an article or series on Ishikawa’s trip.

Upon his return, Ishikawa was told by the same editor that the images were unusable and thus felt that he was unfit to become a photographer. However, when he was invited by Daido Moriyama to meet at a bar in Shinjuku's Golden Gai, Moriyama complimented the photos Ishikawa took from his expedition, whose support encouraged Ishikawa to continue traveling and pursuing photography. Eventually the photos were exhibited at Epsite (Epson Imaging Gallery) and used in Ishikawa's first book Pole to Pole (2003). Through Pole to Pole, Ishikawa established his book planning approach wherein the organization of the images is generally in chronological order so as to mirror his lived journey. Ishikawa continues to shoot primarily with film, namely with the Makina 670 and Mamiya 7 II, and has published photobooks yearly from his travels. Many of Ishikawa's photobooks document his climbing expeditions, especially those in the Himalayas, and the towns and roads leading up to them. Ishikawa has been lauded for not only his ability to shoot within extreme climates but also to convey the vastness and intensity of these landscapes within his photographs.

Ishikawa's photography methodology trace back to his interests in ethnography and anthropology: In addition to landscapes, Ishikawa also routinely photographs local communities and cultural practices, and writes detailed notes on the customs and natural phenomena relevant to the area. Some of Ishikawa projects are the culmination of years of traveling and research, such as his award winning books Archipelago (2009) and Corona (2010). For Archipelago (2009), Ishikawa shot local festivals and the daily lives of islanders situated north and south of Japan over the course of ten years, as an attempt to reframe the boundaries and histories of Japan through interventions of marginalized cultures. Corona (2010) is similarly the combined travels and research of ten years across the Polynesian Triangle, documenting the people and religious customs of the communities within the "invisible continent" through both image and text.

Through his travels, Ishikawa has developed intimate relationships with the people he encountered, notably the sherpa whom have guided many of his climbs. Ishikawa's latest book Sherpa (2020), featuring portraits of sherpa, was sold to raise funding for sherpas who have been financially impacted by the loss of travel during the COVID-19 pandemic.

=== Awards ===
Ishikawa has received the Kodansha Publication Culture Award for Photography (2008) for his books New Dimension and Polar;; Higashikawa Award’s New Photographer Prize (2009) Sagamihara Award (2010) for Archipelago; Domon Ken Award (2011) for Corona, and the Lifetime Achievement Award from the Photographic Society of Japan (2020).

== Filmmaking ==
In addition to photographing his journeys, Ishikawa has also filmed documentary-style short form videos of the areas surrounding the mountains and footage of the climb.

Ishikawa's first film venture as a cinematographer Shari, directed by and starring Nao Yoshigai, is set to be released in 2021. The film follows the fictional narrative of a red figure, played by Yoshigai, set in the town Shari of Shiretoko, the northernmost part of Japan. Ishikawa frequently visits Shiretoko and started the group Shashin Zero Banchi Shari (写真ゼロ番地知床) for local Shiretoko photographers.

== Writing ==
Ishikawa has penned numerous non-fiction books about his travels and children's adventure books.

=== The Last Adventurer ===
In 2004, Ishikawa and balloonist Michio Kanda travelled in a hot air balloon across the Pacific Ocean. About 1,600 km from Japan, Ishikawa and Kanda realized that they did not bring enough fuel and were forced to land in the water. The two spent hours in a gondola until they were picked up and returned to Japan by a Panamanian cargo ship. Over four years after the trip, the gondola was found on the shores of Akusekijima – the person who had found Ishikawa’s gear reached out to Ishikawa. Among the gear was an old SLR that belonged to Ishikawa, which became known as the “drifting camera.” In 2008, Ishikawa wrote a non-fiction book based on the event titled 最後の冒険家 (= The Last Adventurer) which received the Kaiko Takeshi award.

== Selected exhibitions ==
=== Selected solo exhibitions ===
- 2005: The Void, Shinjuku Nikon Salon, Tokyo; Osaka Nikon Salon, Osaka (2006)
- 2007: Polar, Konica Minolta Plaza Tokyo; Scai the Bathhouse, Tokyo
- 2008: Polar/New Dimension: Ishikawa Naoki Photo Exhibition, Kodak Photo Salon, Tokyo
- Mt. Fuji
- 2009: Archipelago, Canon Gallery S, Tokyo; Chukyo University Art Gallery C. Square, Nagoya; Niki Club, Tochigi (2010); Gallery Satsu, Tokyo (2010); Okinawa Prefectural Museum & Art Museum, Okinawa (2010)
- 2011: 8848, Scai the Bathhouse, Tokyo
- 2012: Remembrance 3.11, Yamagata Institute of The Arts, Yamagata; Ginza Nikon Salon, Tokyo; Osaka Nikon Salon, Osaka
- 2015: New Map, Yokohama Civic Art Gallery Azamino, Kanagawa
- 2016: Capturing the Map of Light on This Planet, Art Tower Mito, Ibaraki; traveled to Ichihara Lakeside Museum, Chiba (2017); Niigata City Art Museum (2017); The Museum of Art, Kochi (2018); Kitakyushu Municipal Museum of Art, Fukuoka (2018); Tokyo Opera City Art Gallery (2019)
- 2020: Naoki Ishikawa Photo Exhibition, Irie Taikichi Memorial Museum of Photography Nara City, Nara
- 2020: Japonésia, Japan House, São Paulo; Museu Oscar Neimeyer, Brazil (2021)

=== Selected group exhibitions ===
- 2010: Setouchi International Art Festival, Fukutake House (Former Megi Elementary School), Kagawa
- 2012: Echigo-Tsumari Art Triennale 2012, Niigata
- 2012: Daido Moriyama x Naoki Ishikawa To Nirvana and Back, Shibuya Hikarie 8/CUBE 1,2,3, Tokyo
- 2014: Kunisaki Art Festival 2014, Kunimi Furusato Tenjikan Old Arinaga House & ZECCO, Oita
- 2015: to the north, from here: naoki ishikawa + yoshitomo nara, The Watari Museum of Contemporary Art, Tokyo
- 2017: Sapporo International Art Festival 2017, Miyanomori International Museum of Art, Sapporo, Hokkaido
- 2017: Oku-Noto Triennale, Suzu, Ishikawa
- 2017: Okinawa: Through the Eyes of a Photographer 1972–2017, Okinawa Prefectural Museum & Art Museum, Okinawa

== Selected publications ==
- Pole to Pole. Tokyo: Chuokoron-Shinsha Inc., 2003.
- The Void. Tokyo: Knee High Media, 2005.
- New Dimension. Kyoto: AKAAKA, 2007.
- Polar. Tokyo: Little More, 2007.
- Vernacular. Kyoto: AKAAKA, 2008.
- Mt. Fuji. Tokyo: Little More, 2008.
- Archipelago. Tokyo: Shueisha, 2009.
- Corona. Tokyo: Seidosha, 2010.
- Kunisaki Peninsula. Tokyo: Seidosha, 2014.
- Hair. Tokyo: Seidosha, 2014.
- Kata and Satoyama. Tokyo: Seidosha, 2015.
- Denali. Ishikawa: SLANT, 2016.
- Shiretoko Peninsula. Hokkaido: The Hokkaido Shimbun Press, 2017.
- Svalbard. Tokyo: SUPER LABO, 2017.
- Ryusei no Shima. Tokyo: SUPER LABO, 2018.
- Ama Dablam. Ishikawa: SLANT, 2019
- The Himalayas. Tokyo: TOO MUCH Magazine, 2019.
- Capturing the Map of Light on This Planet. Tokyo: Little More, 2019.
- Marebito. Tokyo: Shokgakukan, 2019.
- Everest. Tokyo: CCC Media House, 2019.
- Sherpa. Tokyo: TOO MUCH Magazine The North Face, 2020.

Himalaya Series published by SLANT (Ishikawa, Japan):

- Lhotse. SLANT, 2013.
- Makalu. SLANT, 2014.
- K2. SLANT, 2015.
- Gasherbrum II. SLANT, 2019.

In collaboration with Super Labo and Beams, Ishikawa has been working on a 47 book series named Nippon Series, with each book corresponding to one of the 47 prefectures in Japan. The following books have been published thus far: Hokkaido (2018), Akita (2018), Niigata (2018), Tokyo (2018), Oita (2018), Yamaguchi (2019), and Ishikawa (2019).
