= Hiroshi Watanabe (photographer) =

Japanese/US photographer

Hiroshi Watanabe (渡邉 博史, Watanabe Hiroshi) is a California-based Japanese photographer. His books include I See Angels Every Day and Findings.

== Life and work ==
Born in Sapporo, Hokkaido, Japan, in 1951, Watanabe graduated from the Department of Photography of Nihon University in 1975 and moved to Los Angeles where he worked as a production coordinator for Japanese television commercials and later co-founded a Japanese coordination services company. He obtained an MBA from UCLA in 1993, but two years later his earlier interest in photography revived; from 2000 he has worked full-time at photography.

After five self-published books, Watanabe's first to be published conventionally was I See Angels Every Day, monochrome portraits of the patients and other scenes within San Lázaro psychiatric hospital in Quito, Ecuador. This won the 2007 Photo City Sagamihara award for Japanese professional photographers.

In 2005, a portfolio of his work was featured in Nueva Luz photographic journal, volume 10#3. In 2007 Watanabe won a "Critical Mass" award from Photolucida that allowed publication of his monograph Findings.

In 2008, his work of North Korea won Santa Fe Center Project Competition First Prize, and the book titled "Ideology of Paradise" was published in Japan.

He was invited and participated in commission projects such as "Real Venice" in 2010 (its exhibition was a program in 2011 Venice Biennale), "Bull City Summer" in 2013, and "The Art of Survival, Enduring Turmoil of Tule Lake" in 2014.

Watanabe's works are in the permanent collections of the Houston Museum of Fine Arts, George Eastman House, and Santa Barbara Museum of Art.

== Publications ==
- Veiled Observations and Reflections. Hiroshi Watanabe (self-published), West Hollywood, Calif.: 2002.
- Faces. West Hollywood, Calif.: Hiroshi Watanabe, 2002–2005.
  - 1. San Lazaro Psychiatric Hospital. 2003.
  - 2. Kabuki Players. 2003.
  - 3. Ena Bunraku. 2005.
  - 4. Noh Masks of Naito Clan. 2005.
- Watakushi wa mainichi, tenshi o mite iru (私は毎日、天使を見ている。) / I See Angels Every Day. Mado-sha, Tokyo, Japan: 2007. ISBN 978-4-89625-085-5
- Findings. Photolucida, Portland, OR: 2007. ISBN 978-1-934334-00-3.
- Paradaisu ideorogī (パラダイスイデオロギー) / Ideology in Paradise. Mado-sha, Tokyo, Japan: 2008. ISBN 978-4-89625-091-6
- Suo Sarumawashi. Photo-Eye, Santa Fe, N.M., 2009. ISBN 978-0-9840927-0-3.
- Love Point. Toseisha, Tokyo, Japan: 2010. ISBN 978-4-88773-103-5
- Love Point. One Picture Book #66, Nazraeli Press, Portland, OR: 2010. ISBN 978-1-59005-302-7.
- The Day the Dam Collapses. Daylight Books, Hillsborough, NC & Tosei-sha Publishing Co., Ltd, Tokyo, Japan: 2014. ISBN 978-0-9897981-1-2
- Kwaidan, Stories and Studies of Strange Things, photographs by Hiroshi Watanabe, Unicorn Publishing Group, LLP, London, UK: 2019 ISBN 978-1-911604-98-3
