= Yoshikazu Shirakawa =

Japanese photographer (1935–2022)

Yoshikazu Shirakawa (白川 義員, Shirakawa Yoshikazu; 1935 – April 5, 2022) was a Japanese photographer.

Shirakawa was born in Shikokuchuo City, Ehime Prefecture. As a prolific photographer, over a span of 50 years he created 12 photoseries in different parts of the world, from China to Antarctica. Shirakawa is particularly well known for his book Himalayas, published by Harry N. Abrams in 1971.

== Bibliography ==
- Himalayas, preface by Arnold Toynbee & preface by Sir Edmund Hillary. New York: Harry N. Abrams (1971) ISBN 0-8109-0162-5
- The Alps, text translated by Max A. Wyss, introduction by Chris Bonington. London: Thames and Hudson (1973) ISBN 0-500-24086-8
  - (Translated from the German edition, Majestät der Alpen, by J. Maxwell Brownjohn)
