= Kiyoshi Sonobe =

Japanese photographer

Kiyoshi Sonobe (薗部 澄, Sonobe Kiyoshi; 1921–1996) was a Japanese photographer.

Sonobe is born in Tsukuda, Tokyo.

He died on 3 March 1996, aged 75.
