= Keizō Kitajima =

Japanese photographer (born 1954)

Keizō Kitajima (北島 敬三, Kitajima Keizō; born 1954) is a Japanese photographer.
