= Tokumitsu Iwagō =

Japanese photographer

Tokumitsu Iwagō (岩合 徳光, Iwagō Tokumitsu; 1916–2007) was a renowned Japanese photographer. Mitsuaki Iwagō is his son.
