= Norihiko Matsumoto =

Japanese photographer and writer about photography

Norihiko Matsumoto (松本 徳彦, Matsumoto Norihiko; born 1936) is a Japanese photographer and photography writer.

== Early life ==
Born in Onomichi, Hiroshima, on 1 January 1936, Matsumoto graduated from Nihon University in 1958.

== Photography career ==
Matsumoto started to work for the publishing company Shufu-to-Seikatsusha while still a student, but went freelance in 1963, mostly working for corporate and other magazines. From 1964 his photography was mainly of the theatre.

Matsumoto has published numerous books about the history of Japanese photography.

Eighteen prints by Matsumoto are in the collection of the Tokyo Photographic Art Museum.

== Books by Matsumoto ==
- Mizutani Yaeko 1974–1979 (水谷八重子 1974–1979). Tokyo: Heibonsha, 1980. Photographs by Matsumoto.
- Kamera o hajimeru hito no tame ni (カメラを始める人のために). Tokyo: Ikeda Shoten, 1984.
- Shōwa o toraeta shashinka no me: Sengo shashin no ayumi o tadoru (昭和をとらえた写真家の眼 戦後写真の歩みをたどる). Tokyo: Asahi Shinbunsha, 1989.
- A Collection of Japanese Photographs, 1912–1940. Tokyo: Shashinkosha, 1990.
- Matsumoto Norihiko sakuhin-ten: Nissei gekijō 1964–1971 (展覧会カタログ『松本徳彦作品展 日生劇場の演劇1964～1971). Tokyo: JCII Photo Salon, 1995.
- Shashinka no kontakuto tanken: Ichimai no meisaku wa dō ebareta ka (写真家のコンタクト探検 一枚の名作はどう選ばれたか). Tokyo: Heibonsha, 1996.
- Monokurōmu shashin no miryoku (モノクローム写真の魅力). Tonbo no Hon. Tokyo: Shinchōsha, 1998. With Tsuneo Enari.
- Nihon no bijutsukan to shashin korekushon (日本の美術館と写真コレクション). Kyoto: Tankōsha, 2002.
- Koshiji Fubuki: Ai no sanka (越路吹雪 愛の讃歌) = Fubuki Koshiji: Hymne à l'amour. Kyoto: Tankōsha, 2003.
- Shimanami Norumandī "futatsu no toshi" shashinten: Matsumoto Norihiko: Shimanami kaidō 10-shūnen kinen (しまなみ・ノルマンディー「二つの都市」写真展 松本徳彦 しまなみ海道10周年記念). Onomichi, Hiroshima: Onomichi City Museum of Art, 2009.
- Toki o kizanda shashin: Hozon ga nozomareru firumu (ときを刻んだ写真 保存が望まれるフィルム). Tokyo: JCII Photo Salon, 2011.
- Shitte imasuka ... Hiroshima Nagasaki no genshi bakudan: Hibaku kara 70-nen (知っていますか...ヒロシマ・ナガサキの原子爆弾 被爆から70年). Tokyo: JCII Photo Salon, 2015.
