= Tadashi Shimada =

Japanese photographer

Tadashi Shimada (嶋田 忠, Shimada Tadashi; born 1949) is a Japanese photographer whose work has been featured at Tokyo Photographic Art Museum.
