= Kōjō Tanaka =

Japanese photographer

Kōjō Tanaka (田中 光常, Tanaka Kōjō; May 11, 1924 – May 6, 2016) was a renowned Japanese photographer.

He graduated from Hokkaido University in 1944.
