= Jun Miki =

Japanese photographer (1919–1992)

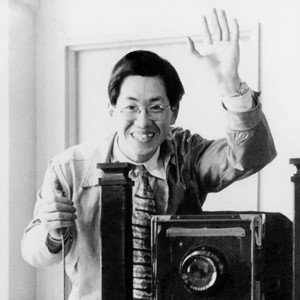
Jun Miki,1950

Jun Miki (三木淳, Miki Jun; 14 September 1919 – 22 February 1992) was a Japanese photographer and one of Japan's pioneers in photojournalism. The Selection Committee of Nikon Salon established the Miki Jun Award in 1999 to remember his legacy.

== Books showing Miki's works ==
- Dokyumentarī no jidai: Natori Yōnosuke, Kimura Ihee, Domon Ken, Miki Jun no shashin kara (ドキュメンタリーの時代：名取洋之助・木村伊兵衛・土門 拳・三木淳の写真から) / The Documentary Age: Photographs by Natori Younosuke, Kimura Ihee, Domon Ken, and Miki Jun. Tokyo: Tokyo Metropolitan Museum of Photography, 2001. An exhibition catalogue. Captions in both Japanese and English, other text in Japanese only.
