= Kon Sasaki =

Japanese photographer (1918–2009)

Kon Sasaki (佐々木 崑, Sasaki Kon; born 1918) died March 27, 2009, was an award-winning Japanese photographer. He was a rare apprentice to legendary post-war photographer Ihei Kimura.

== Early life ==
Born on November 2, 1918, in Qingdao, China, Sasaki took an interest in photography after purchasing a Togo camera in 6th grade. He continued to take photos during his military service being stationed at Pyongyang, Manchuria, and Manchukuo before returning to Kobe in 1942.

== Photography career ==
After returning to Kobe, Sasaki worked as a photojournalist and freelance photographer before meeting Ihei Kimura in 1951 and would later move to Tokyo as his apprentice in 1960. Sasaki was reportedly told, "You'll go bad if you keep photographing bras. Come over to Tokyo." Accepting Kimura's invitation, he left his photo studio to a friend, sold all his camera gear, and bought a Leica M3.

As a photojournalist he covered social issues including heroin addiction, gradeschool dropouts, and prostitution.

Sasaki began publishing regularly on Asahi Camera in 1966, becoming renowned for his macro work on flowers, insects, and small animals. 256 of his photos were published on the magazine across 23 years with his specialty being newborn life and the process of metamorphosis.
