= Takuya Tsukahara =

Japanese photographer

- 塚原 琢哉
- Born: 1937 (age 88–89)

Takuya Tsukahara (塚原 琢哉, Tsukahara Takuya; born 1937) is a Japanese photographer.
