= Chōtoku Tanaka =

Japanese photographer (born 1947)

Chōtoku Tanaka (田中 長徳, Tanaka Chōtoku; born 1947) is a Japanese photographer.
