= Satoshi Kuribayashi =

Japanese photographer

Satoshi Kuribayashi (栗林 慧, Kuribayashi Satoshi; born 1939) is a Japanese photographer.

== Profile ==
He was born in Fengtian, Manchukuo (present-day Shenyang, People’s Republic of China) and came from Tabira Town, Kitamatsuura District, Nagasaki Prefecture (now part of Hirado City). He dropped out of the Tokyo College of Photography. His specialty was biological photography, particularly of insects. His son is the contemporary artist Takashi Kuribayashi.

His research and development of equipment and techniques, originally motivated by the desire to photograph living organisms, have earned high acclaim beyond the field of biological photography. Among his innovations are the so-called “insect-eye lens,” capable of extreme close-ups of insects while still maintaining remarkable depth of field such that even backgrounds at infinite distance remain barely blurred, and a system that made it possible to capture events such as the ballistic dispersal of pollen at 1/50,000 of a second. His technologies and expertise extended beyond still photography to moving images as well, and have been utilized in NHK program production, among other applications.
