= Manabu Miyazaki (photographer) =

Japanese photographer

Manabu Miyazaki (宮崎学, Miyazaki Manabu), born in Nagano Prefecture in 1949, is a Japanese wildlife photographer.

His work Fukurō / Ural Owl won the Domon Ken Award in 1990. In 1996 two of his books won the Kodansha Publishing Culture Award (講談社出版文化賞) for a work of photography.
