= Kazuo Kitai =

Japanese photographer

Kazuo Kitai (北井 一夫, Kitai Kazuo; born 1944) is a Japanese photographer.

His work is included in the collection of the Museum of Fine Arts Houston, and the Art Institute of Chicago.
