= Mitsuaki Iwagō =

Japanese photographer and filmmaker

Mitsuaki Iwagō (岩合 光昭, Iwagō Mitsuaki; born November 27, 1950 in Tokyo) is a prominent Japanese wildlife photographer and filmmaker.

== Biography ==
He is the son of Tokumitsu Iwagō, himself a noted wildlife photographer. After graduating from Hosei University, Iwago went as his father's assistant to the Galápagos Islands, where he decided to become a photographer. His work Letters from the Sea (海からの手紙, Umi kara no tegami) won the Kimura Ihei Award in 1979. He is also the first Japanese photographer whose work has twice appeared on the cover of National Geographic (May 1986 and December 1994). He is now a spokesman for Olympus Corporation.

Since 2012, Iwago has appeared on the TV program "MITSUAKI IWAGO'S WORLD "CATS" TRAVELOGUE(IWASGO MITSUAKI NO SEKAI NEKOARUKI, (岩合光昭の世界ネコ歩き)" (NHK BS Premium). In the TV program, Iwago is shooting videos of cats from all over the world.

== Publications ==
- Serengeti: Natural Order on the African Plain. Chronicle Books, 1987. ISBN 0-87701-441-8.
- In the Lion's Den. Chronicle Books, 1996. ISBN 0-8118-1203-0.
- Priceless: The Vanishing Beauty of a Fragile Planet, coauthored with Bradley Trevor Greive, Andrews McMeel, 2003. ISBN 0-7407-2695-1.
- Tabi yukeba neko (旅ゆけば猫). Nihon Shuppansha, 2005. ISBN 4-89048-894-4.
