= Gesshū Ogawa =

Japanese photographer

Gesshū Ogawa (小川 月舟, Ogawa Gesshū; 1891-1967) was a renowned Japanese photographer.
