= Yukio Tabuchi =

Japanese photographer

Yukio Tabuchi (田淵 行男, Tabuchi Yukio; 1905–1989) was a renowned Japanese photographer.
