= Kinsuke Shimada =

Japanese photographer

Kinsuke Shimada (島田 謹介, Shimada Kinsuke; 1900–1994) was a renowned Japanese photographer.
