= Akira Kinoshita =

Japanese photographer

Akira Kinoshita (木之下 晃, Kinoshita Akira) (16 July 1936 – 12 January 2015) was a Japanese photographer who specialized in photographing musicians.

Kinoshita was born in Suwa, Nagano, on 16 July 1936. He graduated from Nihon Fukushi University, and then worked for Chūnichi Shinbun and Hakuhodo. From the 1970s, he has published collections of photographs of musicians and other music-related photobooks.

Kinoshita's work is held in the permanent collection of the Tokyo Metropolitan Museum of Photography.

== Books ==
- World of Seiji Ozawa, 1981 (Kodansha)
- 1984 Musician of the World (3 volumes) (Shogakukan)
- 1992: maestro Herbert von Karajan] (Asahi Shimbun)
- Watanabe Akira 雄 [1996] (Ongaku)
- Asahina Takashi ~ 2002's] art is the best longevity (Shinchosha)
- [2004] Carlos Kleiber (Alpha Beta)
- [2005] Taking Takemitsu (Shogakukan)
- Maestro [2006] (Shogakukan)
- Journey to the Verdi (実業之日本社)
- Ishi. Portrait with a Stone. Tokyo: Asukashinsa Publishing Co., 2009.

== Major exhibitions ==
- In 1971 "On Stage ~ Sound Landscape" (Ginza Nikon Salon)
- 1976 "Musician of the World" (Wako Hall)
- 1995 "sound picture" (Kanagawa Prefectural Hall)
- 1996 "The perfection of sound" (Suwa City Museum of Art)
- 1998 "A Musical Journey in Vienna" (Mitsukoshi Nihonbashi)
- In 1999 "Opera House" (Wako Hall)
- 2002 "master musicians in the world ~ 100" (Matsumoto City Museum of Art)
- 2002 "Musician of the 20th century" (Aichi Arts Center)
- 2005 "Masters of the World (Maestro) ~ 101" (Muza Kawasaki Symphony Hall)
- 2006 "photo exhibition, Akira Kinoshita musicians in the world" (Museum Chino, Nagano Prefecture)
- "Journey to the Verdi" (Forest Opera Tokyo) (Tokyo Metropolitan Festival Hall Foyer)
- Akira Kinoshita Photo Exhibition "master musician in the world ~" (signed autograph photo exhibition) (Ginza Wako Hall)
