= Tokutarō Tanaka =

Japanese photographer

Tokutarō Tanaka (田中 徳太郎, Tanaka Tokutarō; 1909–1989) was a Japanese photographer.
