= Noriaki Yokosuka =

Japanese photographer

Noriaki Yokosuka (横須賀 功光, Yokosuka Noriaki; 1937–2003) was a Japanese photographer.
