= Kazuyoshi Nomachi =

Japanese photographer (born 1946)

Kazuyoshi Nomachi (野町 和嘉, Nomachi Kazuyoshi; born 1946) is a Japanese photographer. He embraced Islam as his religion in 1994
