= Yūkichi Watabe =

Japanese photographer

Yūkichi Watabe (渡部 雄吉, Watabe Yūkichi; 1924–1993) was a Japanese photographer.

== Publications ==
- A Criminal Investigation. Paris: Xavier Barral; Le Bal, 2011. ISBN 978-2915173826.
- Morocco
- Postwar Japan
- To the Sea
- Alaska Eskimo
- Stakeout Diary. Tokyo: Roshin, 2014. ISBN 978-4-9907230-0-2. Text in Japanese and English. Edition of 1000 copies.
