= Senzō Yoshioka =

Japanese photographer

Senzō Yoshioka (吉岡 専造, Yoshioka Senzō; 1916–2005) was a renowned Japanese photographer.
