= Yoshihiro Tatsuki =

Japanese photographer

Yoshihiro Tatsuki (立木 義浩, Tatsuki Yoshihiro; born October 25, 1937) is a Japanese photographer.

== Biography ==
He graduated from the Tokyo Professional School of Photography (later Tokyo Polytechnic University) in 1958. He began working as a photographer at Ad Center, where Seiichi Horiuchi worked as art director.

Yoshihiro Tatsuki's Mariko Kaga monograph, published in 1971, is a candid and intimate story-portrait of his muse, Japanese actress Mariko Kaga.

== Books ==
- Girl, 1971
- Private life. Mariko Kaga, 1971.
- My America, 1980.
- Hanakeshiki - Girls and Women, 1981.
- Portrait of a Family, 1990.
- Toji" (Toji Temple), 1998.
- Kobe hito, 2001.
- Commonplace Landscape, 2007.
- Little Girl, 2012.
- Tōkyōtō, 2012.
- Yoshihiro Tatsuki 1-8, 2012.
- Etude, 2013.
