= Naoya Hatakeyama =

Japanese photographer

- Born: 1958 (age 67–68); Rikuzentakata, Japan
- Known for: Photography

Naoya Hatakeyama (畠山 直哉, Hatakeyama Naoya; born 1958) is a Japanese photographer. His work explores human intervention with the landscape and natural materials, including the life of cities and the built environment.

== Life ==
Hatakeyama was born in Japan Rikuzentakata, Iwate, in 1958. He graduated from the University of Tsukuba, School of Art and Design in 1981 and completed postgraduate studies at the University of Tsukuba in 1984.

== Awards ==
- 1997: 22nd Kimura Ihei Memorial Photography Award
- 2000: 16th Higashikawa Domestic Photographer Prize
- 2001: 42nd Mainichi Award of Art
- 2003: Photographer of the Year Award from the Photographic Society of Japan

== Books ==
- Lime Works. Tōkyō: Synergy, 1996. ISBN 4-915877-39-6.
  - Lime Works. Osaka: Amus Arts Press, 2002. ISBN 4-946483-74-8.
  - Lime Works. Kyōto: Seigensha, 2008. ISBN 978-4-86152-124-9.
- Underground. Tōkyō: Media Factory, 2000. ISBN 4-8401-0088-8.
- Under Construction. Tōkyō: Kenchiku Shiryo Kenkyusha, 2001. ISBN 4-87460-716-0.
- Slow Glass. United Kingdom: Light Xchange and The Winchester Gallery, 2002. ISBN 1-873451-44-X.
- 畠山直哉 = Naoya Hatakeyama. Kyōto: Tankōsha, 2002. ISBN 4-473-01920-9.
- Naoya Hatakeyama. Ostfildern-Ruit, Germany: Hatje Cantz, 2002. ISBN 3-7757-1159-7.
- Atmos. Portland, Ore.: Nazraeli Press, 2004. ISBN 1-59005-080-0.
- Zeche Westfalen I/II Ahlen. Portland, Ore.: Nazraeli Press, 2006. ISBN 1-59005-151-3.
- Two Mountains - Naoya Hatakeyama and Balthasar Burkhard. Tokyo: Executive Committee of Two Mountains, 2006. ISBN 3-03778-072-X.
- Scales. Portland, Ore.: Nazraeli Press, 2007. ISBN 978-1-59005-216-7.
- Terrils. La Madeleine, France: Light Motiv Editions, 2011. ISBN 978-2-9537908-1-8.
- Ciel Tombé. Kamakura, Japan: Super Labo, 2011. ISBN 978-4-905052-08-1.
- Kesengawa, Light Motiv, France ISBN 9782953790856
- Naoya Hatakeyama: Excavating the Future City Aperture, USA 2018 ISBN 978-1597114325

== Exhibitions ==
- 2001: Fast and Slow, Japanese Pavilion, 49th Venice Biennale. Curator: Eriko Osaka.
- 2003: Atmos, Les Rencontres d'Arles, France. Curator: François Hébel.
- 2009: Rencontres d'Arles, Arles, France.
- 2011–2012: Naoya Hatakeyama: Natural Stories, Tokyo Metropolitan Museum of Photography and San Francisco Museum of Modern Art.
- 2019-2020: Maquettes/Light, Tate Modern
