= Yoshio Watanabe =

Japanese photographer

Yoshio Watanabe (渡辺 義雄, Watanabe Yoshio; 1907–2000) was a Japanese photographer.

== Publications ==
- Kenzō Tange and Noboru Kawazoe. Ise. Prototype of Japanese Architecture. Photographs by Yoshio Watanabe. Cambridge, Massachusetts: The M.I.T. Press, 1965.
- Sutemi Horiguchi and Yoshio Watanabe. Ise jingū. [Tōkyō]: Heibonsha, 1973.
- Yoshio Watanabe. Ise jingū. Tōkyō: Nikkōrukurabu, 1994.
