= Shihachi Fujimoto =

Japanese photographer

Shihachi Fujimoto (藤本 四八, Fujimoto Shihachi; 1911–2006) was a Japanese photographer.

In 1938, he helped found the Seinen Hodo Shashin Kenkyukai (Youth Reportage Photography Research Association), which was formed with the support of Photo Times.

Fujimoto's works are in the permanent collection of the Tokyo Metropolitan Museum of Photography.

Iida City Museum runs a photographic contest, Fujimoto Shihachi Shashin Bunka-shō (藤本四八写真文化賞), in his honour.
