= Hichirō Ouchi =

Japanese photographer

Hichirō Ouchi (尾内 七郎, Ouchi Hichirō; 1913–2005) was a Japanese photographer.
