= Tsuneo Enari =

Japanese photographer (born 1936)

Tsuneo Enari (江成 常夫, Enari Tsuneo; born 1936) is a Japanese photographer.
