= Kōnosuke Ishii =

Japanese photographer

Kōnosuke Ishii (石井幸之助, Ishii Kōnosuke; 1916–1997) was a renowned Japanese photographer.
