= Japan Professional Photographers Society =

Japanese photography organization

The Japan Professional Photographers Society (日本写真家協会, Nihon Shashinka Kyōkai) is a Tokyo-based organization of photographers founded in 1950. Its logo reads "JPS". It was formed from the combination of three earlier organizations, none more than two years old: Seinen Hōdō Shashin Kenkyūkai (青年報道写真研究会), Seinen Shashinka Kyōkai (青年写真家協会, Young Photographers' Association), and Shashinka Shūdan (写真家集団, Photographers' Group),

The organization exists to maintain professional standards and to protect the interests of professional photographers. It also sponsors exhibitions of interest to the general public, and, since 2005, the Younosuke Natori Photography Award for photographers under 30. Its current President (2007) is Takeyoshi Tanuma.

== Notable members ==
- Takashi Amano
- Ihei Kimura, former chair of the society
- Susumu Matsushima (honorary)
- Toyoko Tokiwa, author of Kiken no Adabana

== Sources and further reading ==
- Matsuda Takako. "Major Photography Clubs and Associations." In Anne Wilkes Tucker, et al. The History of Japanese Photography. New Haven: Yale University Press, 2003. ISBN 0-300-09925-8. Pp. 373.
- (in Japanese) Nihon shashinka jiten (日本写真家事典) / 328 Outstanding Japanese Photographers. Kyoto: Tankōsha, 2000. P. 347. ISBN 4-473-01750-8. Despite its alternative title in English, the text is all in Japanese.
