= Hiromi Nagakura =

Japanese photographer

Hiromi Nagakura (長倉 洋海, Nagakura Hiromi; born 1952) is a Japanese photographer.

In 2005 Nagakura's book Zabitto ikka, ie o tateru won the Kodansha Publishing Culture Award (講談社出版文化賞) for a work of photography.
