= Shisei Kuwabara =

Japanese photographer

Front cover of Minamata, a collection of Kuwabara's photographs of the effects of mercury poisoning.

Shisei Kuwabara (桑原 史成, Kuwabara Shisei; born 7 October 1936) is a photojournalist best known for his depiction of the effects of mercury poisoning on people in and near Minamata over a period of some forty years.

Kuwabara was born — as Fumiaki Kuwabara (桑原史成, Kuwabara Fumiaki) — in the village of Kibe (now part of Tsuwano), Shimane Prefecture, Japan. In 1960 he graduated from the Tokyo University of Agriculture and Tokyo Photo School (later Tokyo College of Photography).

In the same year Kuwabara started work as a freelance photographer. With a letter of introduction from a journalist with Shūkan Asahi magazine, he visited the director of Minamata Municipal Hospital, Dr Noboru Ōhashi, in July, to ask for permission to photograph. Ōhashi gave him permission for long-term coverage.

Kuwabara's photographs of Minamata were shown in his first solo exhibition, Minamata-byō (Minamata disease), at the Fuji Photo Salon in Tokyo in September 1962. This won the newcomers' award of the Japan Photo Critics Association.

Kuwabara's works have also won an award from Kodansha in 1965, the Photographic Society of Japan's Annual Award in 1971, and the Ina Nobuo Award in 1982.

Since 1997, Tsuwano has had a gallery largely devoted to Kuwabara's work. Until March 2004, this was called the Tsuwano Documentary Photograph Gallery; it was then renamed the Shisei Kuwabara Photographics Museum.

== Books by Kuwabara ==
- Shashin-shū Minamata-byō (写真集 水俣病) / Minamata Desease [sic]. Tokyo: San'ichi Shobō, 1965.
- Shashin-kiroku Minamata-byō 1960–1970 (写真記録 水俣病 1960–1970, "Documentary: Minamata disease"). Tokyo: Asahi Shinbun, 1970.
- Seikatsusha gunzō (生活者群像, "Collage of living people"). Tokyo: San'ichi Shobō, 1980.
- Minamata Kankoku Betonamu (水俣・韓国・ベトナム). Tokyo: Banseisha, 1982.
- Tōji no sato Kōrai, Richō (陶磁の里 高麗・李朝). Tokyo: Iwanami, 1984.
- Kōrai, Richō gendai tōjisen (高麗・李朝現代陶磁撰). Tokyo: Mainichi Shinbun, 1985.
- Kankoku genkei (韓国原影, "Korea's original scenes"). Tokyo: San'ichi Shobō, 1986.
- Minamata (水俣, "Minamata"). Komichi Shobō, 1986.
- Hōdōshashinka (報道写真家, "Documentary photographer"). Tokyo: Iwanami, 1989.
- Kankoku shinjō toro (韓国真情吐露, "Expressing genuine sentiments about Korea"). Tokyo: Ōtsuki, 1990. ISBN 4-272-62013-4
- Yameru taikoku Roshia (病める大国 ロシア, "Russia, a sick great nation"). Tokyo: Heibonsha, 1995. ISBN 4-582-27731-4
- Kuwabara Shisei / Minamata (桑原史成/水俣). Tokyo: Nihon Tosho Sentā, 1996. ISBN 4-8205-7297-0 Black and white photographs, in one volume (sold separately) of a multivolume set about pollution in Japan. In Japanese only.
- Kuwabara Shisei shashin zenshū (桑原史成写真全集, The Complete Works of Kuwabara, Shinsei.) Tokyo: Kusa-no-Ne. Each of these four volumes contains explanatory text in English as well as Japanese.
  - 1. Minamata (水俣, Minamata). 2004. ISBN 4-87648-141-5
  - 2. Kankoku (韓国, South Korea). 1998. ISBN 4-87648-142-3
  - 3. Chikuhō/Okinawa (筑豊/沖縄, Chikuho/Okinawa). 2004. ISBN 4-87648-143-1 The first half is about the declining coalmines of Chikuho.
  - 4. Betonamu (ベトナム, Vietnam). 1999. ISBN 4-87648-144-X
- Imujin-gan: Kaima-mita Kita Chōsen (イムジンガン：垣間見た北朝鮮, "Imjin-gang: Glimpses of North Korea"). Tokyo: Kusa-no-Ne, 2003. ISBN 4-87648-189-X Black and white photographs of North Korea. In Japanese only.

== Other books with works by Kuwabara ==
- Nihon shashin no tenkan: 1960 nendai no hyōgen (日本写真の転換：1960時代の表現) / Innovation in Japanese Photography in the 1960s. Tokyo: Tokyo Metropolitan Museum of Photography, 1991. Exhibition catalogue, text in Japanese and English. Pp. 104–113 are devoted to Kuwabara's photographs of Minamata.
