= Banri Namikawa =

Japanese photographer

Banri Namikawa (並河 萬里, Namikawa Banri; 1931–2006) was a Japanese photographer.
