= Takeyoshi Tanuma =

Japanese photographer (1929–2022)

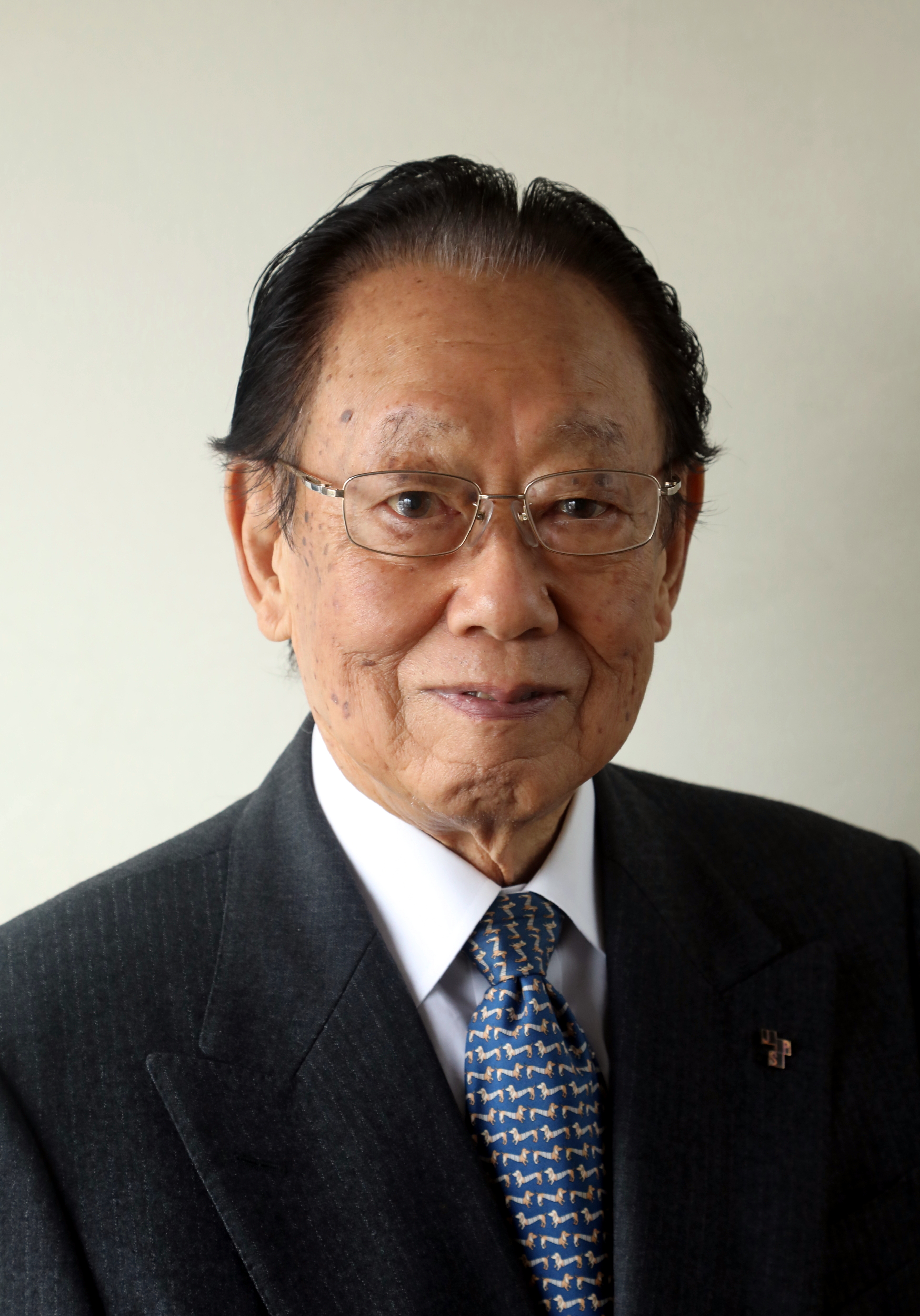
- Born: February 18, 1929; Tokyo, Japan
- Died: June 1, 2022 (aged 93)
- Education: Tokyo Polytechnic University
- Occupation: Photographer

Takeyoshi Tanuma (田沼 武能, Tanuma Takeyoshi; February 18, 1929 – June 1, 2022) was a Japanese photographer.

In 2019, the Japanese government honoured him with the Order of Culture, making him the first photographer to receive the order.
