= Photographic Society of Japan =

Japanese photography organization

The Photographic Society of Japan (日本写真協会, Nihon Shashin Kyōkai) is an organization set up in December 1952 to advance photography in Japan. Its membership of about 1,400 includes both amateur and professional photographers, as well as researchers, critics, and people in the photographic industry. Its address is in Ichibanchō, Chiyoda, Tokyo.

Since its inception, the Society has annually presented a large number of awards.
