= Ryūichi Kaneko =

Japanese photography historian (1948–2021)

Ryūichi Kaneko (金子 隆一, Kaneko Ryūichi; May 18, 1948 – June 30, 2021) was a photography historian and critic, photobook collector, and curator. He also worked as a monk at the Shōgyōin (正行院) temple in the Taitō district of Tokyo while he researched the history of Japanese photography.

== University days ==
In 1967, Kaneko entered Rissho University, where he joined the photography club, affiliated with the All Japan Students Photo Association. Told by one of his university seniors to attend a lecture that the organization was holding, Kaneko went to the lecture hall to find Tatsuo Fukushima, who had recently become the leader of the All Japan Students Photo Association. Though Fukushima's lecture, Kaneko was exposed to works of western photographers like William Klein's Life is Good & Good for You in New York: Trance Witness Revels; Robert Frank's The Americans; and Richard Avedon's Nothing Personal; and also works of Japanese photographers like Shōmei Tōmatsu's Senryō (“Occupation"), Uchi ("Home"), and 11:02 Nagasaki, Eikoh Hosoe's Otoko to Onna (“Man and Woman”) and Bara Kei: Ordeal by Roses; and Ikkō Narahara's Human Land: Ningen no Tochi.

With other members of the All Japan Students Photo Association, Kaneko participated in many of its collective photography activities, whose goal was to cultivate culture, create a federation of photographers oriented to a common goal, and create documentation of these efforts.

One example was Hokkaido 101. The project was started in 1969, marking the 101st anniversary of the annexation of Hokkaido in 1869 after the Meiji Restoration. Some scholars say that the internal colonialism of Ezo, the former name of the Hokkaido, that displaced native Ainu peoples and was the beginning of the colonial legacy of the Japanese Empire. This differs from the standard narrative that Hokkaido was an unpeopled frontier that the Japanese developed. The goal of Hokkaido 101 was to photograph and document the what remained of the history of Japan's internal colonialism. Although the project was never finished, it was formative to Kaneko's decision to pursue the path of a photography historian and critic. Another example was the Pollution Campaign project that the All Japan Students Photo Association organized in 1970. Kaneko helped to organize the project and photographed pollution across Japan. The photographs taken by the group were organized and published in a photobook, Kono Chijō ni Wareware no Kuni wa Nai (“There is No Country for Us on This Earth”).

It was during his university days that Kaneko realized that he had no talent for photography and explored other methods that he could be involved with photography without directly taking photographs. This realization was the starting point for his multifaceted photography career.

The photobooks that Kaneko was exposed to while participating in the All Japan Students Photo Association inspired him to collect more. The first one he bought was Eikoh Hosoe's Otoko to Onna (“Man and Woman”) and the first foreign one was William Klein's Life is Good & Good for You in New York: Trance Witness Revels. He said that he wanted to buy more but he could not afford them, particular the foreign ones, because he was a student at the time. That is why he turned his attention to amateur photo magazines of the 1950s and 1960s. After publication of the comprehensive Nihon Shashin Shi, 1840-1945 (“A History of Japanese Photography 1840-1945”), Kaneko realized how vast the history of Japanese photography was and decided to learn about pre-war photography magazines as well. He scoured the used book districts of Kanda, Tokyo to collect these photographic records.

== Post university, 1970s ==
After graduating from university, Kaneko went to the National Diet Library to find copies of the prewar photo magazine Photo Times, but was unsuccessful. So he went to Tokyo's used book district in Kanda to find old photography magazines, and so began avidly collecting various photography books.

In the 1970s, Japanese photography experienced an independent gallery movement. There was a plethora of small independent galleries sprouting up in different corners of Tokyo. Photo Gallery Prism was one such gallery, one of the first which was run by the photographers themselves. In 1976, Kaneko went to Photo Gallery Prism's first exhibition, Kineo Kuwabara's Tokyo Genshi. It was at Photo Gallery Prism that Kaneko began building relationship with various photographers and people involved in Japanese photography like Shinzo Shimao, Hitoshi Tsukiji, Miyabi Taniguchi, and Osamu Hiraki. Kaneko was actively involved in the operation of the gallery. Through this networking, he became to collaborate with Shōmei Tōmatsu on Shashin Koku ("Photo Nation") which recorded the various activities of these young photographers.

in addition to their networking activities, Shashin Koku ("Photo Nation"), also exhibition such as Photography Today, Exhibition 77 which was held at Kanagawa Kenmin Gallery in 1977. This exhibition had a strong influence on the organizers of smaller photography magazines such as Photo Street, who were influenced by the character of the independent gallery movement in Tokyo.

== Later career ==
Kaneko expanded his career as a photography historian and began participating in various publications and exhibitions. He specialized in the Pictorialism and Modern Photography in Japan. He was a researcher for Shogakukan’s twelve-volume Nihon Shashin Zenshū ("Complete Collection of Japanese Photography") which was important to his development as a photography curator and historian.

Kaneko was a lecturer at the Musashino Art University. He also was and lecturer and director at the Tokyo College of Photography and a trustee at the Japan Society for Arts and History.

Another important part of the development of his career happened in 1988 when he became a research specialist for the Tokyo Metropolitan Museum of Photography which opened in 1995 (and later become the Tokyo Photographic Art Museum). He played a pivotal role in researching for the museum's first exhibition, which reexamined Japan's modern photography, The Founding and Development of Modern Photography in Japan.

Kaneko wrote extensively about pre-WWII and post-WWII photography in Japan. In his essay Realism and Propaganda, he said the convergence of modern Japanese photography and high-volume printing reproduction and distribution happened around the 1930s, and as a result photography was generally used as propaganda. But while photography was used for political purposes, there were also more realist expressions that developed on the fringes of society. Kaneko made it his life's work to study these amateur photography magazines and exhibitions. He says that these pre-war modern photographic expressions “gave birth to and demonstrated the potential of the photographic explorations that would take place when the war came to an end and a new era began.” His research chronicles the realism that modern Japanese photographers utilized inside and outside of the political propaganda of the time.

In 2017 Kaneko published a collection of essays in Japanese titled Nihon wa Shashin-koku de Aru (Japan is a Country of Photobooks). In his afterword about Kaneko, Hitoshi Tsukiji, says that Kaneko had an almost encyclopedic knowledge of Japanese and international photographic history; photographic technologies and development techniques; and reproduction techniques. He collected over thirty thousand photography related material over his 50 years of research.

== List of selected contributions ==
- Anne Tucker (2003). The History of Japanese Photography. Kōtarō Iizawa, Naoyuki Kinoshita, 耕太郎 飯沢, 直之 木下, Houston Museum of Fine Arts. New Haven: Yale University Press in association with the Museum of Fine Arts, Houston. ISBN 0-300-09925-8.
- Hiroshi Hamaya (2013). Japan's Modern Divide: The Photographs of Hiroshi Hamaya and Kansuke Yamamoto. Kansuke Yamamoto, Judith Keller, Amanda Maddox, Kōtarō Iizawa, Ryūichi Kaneko. Los Angeles, California: J. Paul Getty Museum. ISBN 978-1-60606-132-9.
- Houston Museum of Fine Arts (2015). For a new world to come: Experiments in Japanese art and photography, 1968-1979. Houston. ISBN 978-0-300-20782-8.
- Nihon Kindai Shashin no Seiritsu (『日本の近代写真の成立』) / The Dawn of Japanese Modern Photography. By Ryūichi Kaneko, Hiroshi Kashiwagi, Toshihara Itō, Hasegawa Akira. Japan, Tokyo: Seikyusha, 1986.
- Ryūichi Kaneko (1989). Indipendento fotogurafāzu in Japan, 1976-83 インディペンデント・フォトグラファーズ・イン・ジャパン1976-83 [Independent photographers in Japan, 1976-83]. Shinzō Shimao, Hiroshi Nagai. Tokyo. ISBN 4-487-75226-4.
- Yamamoto Kansuke: Fukano no Dentatsusha (『山本悍右―不可能の伝達者―』) = Yamamoto Kansuke, Conveyor of the Impossible. By John Solt, Ryūichi Kaneko, Toshi Yamamoto, Takeo Inada, Haruko Tanaka. Japan, Tokyo: East Japan Railway Culture Foundation, 2001
- NIPPON: 22. Tōkyō: Kokusho Kankōkai. 2002. ISBN 4-336-04470-8.
- Yasuzō Nojima, 野島康三 (2005). Kōga kessakushū. Izawa Kōtarō, Kaneko Ryūichi. Tōkyō: Kokusho Kankōkai. ISBN 4-336-04491-0.
- Shōji Ueda, 正治 植田 (2000). Ueda Shōji watakushi no shashin sahō. Ryūichi Kaneko, 金子隆一. TBS Britannica. ISBN 4-484-00217-5.
- Kaneko, Ryūichi (2009). Japanese photobooks of the 1960s and '70s. Ivan Vartanian, Lesley A. Martin, Kyōko Wada 和田京子, 金子隆一, 森山大道. New York: Aperture. ISBN 978-1-59711-094-5.
- Ryūichi Kaneko (2017). The Japanese photobook 1912-1990. Manfred Heiting, Duncan Forbes, John Junkerman, Kaoru Matsumoto. Göttingen: Steidl. ISBN 978-3-95829-176-8.

== Selected books edited by Kaneko ==
- Shiihara, Osamu; 椎原治 (2016). The founding of modern Japanese photography and Osamu Shiihara. Ryūichi Kaneko, Tamotsu Shiihara, 金子隆一, 椎原保, Only Photography. Berlin: Only Photography. ISBN 978-3-9818339-2-8.
- Ōnishi, Shigeru (2021). Shigeru Onishi: A mathematical proposition. Ryūichi Kaneko, Katsuya Ishida, Mizuho Takahashi, Manfred Heiting (First ed.). Göttingen, Germany. ISBN 978-3-95829-706-7.
- Nihon wa Shashinshu no Kuni de aru (『日本は写真集の国である』)/English Translation: Japan is Country of Photobooks, By Ryuichi Kaneko, Japan: Azusa Shuppansha, 2021. ISBN 978-4-87262-711-4
