= Ihei Kimura =

Japanese photographer (1901–1974)

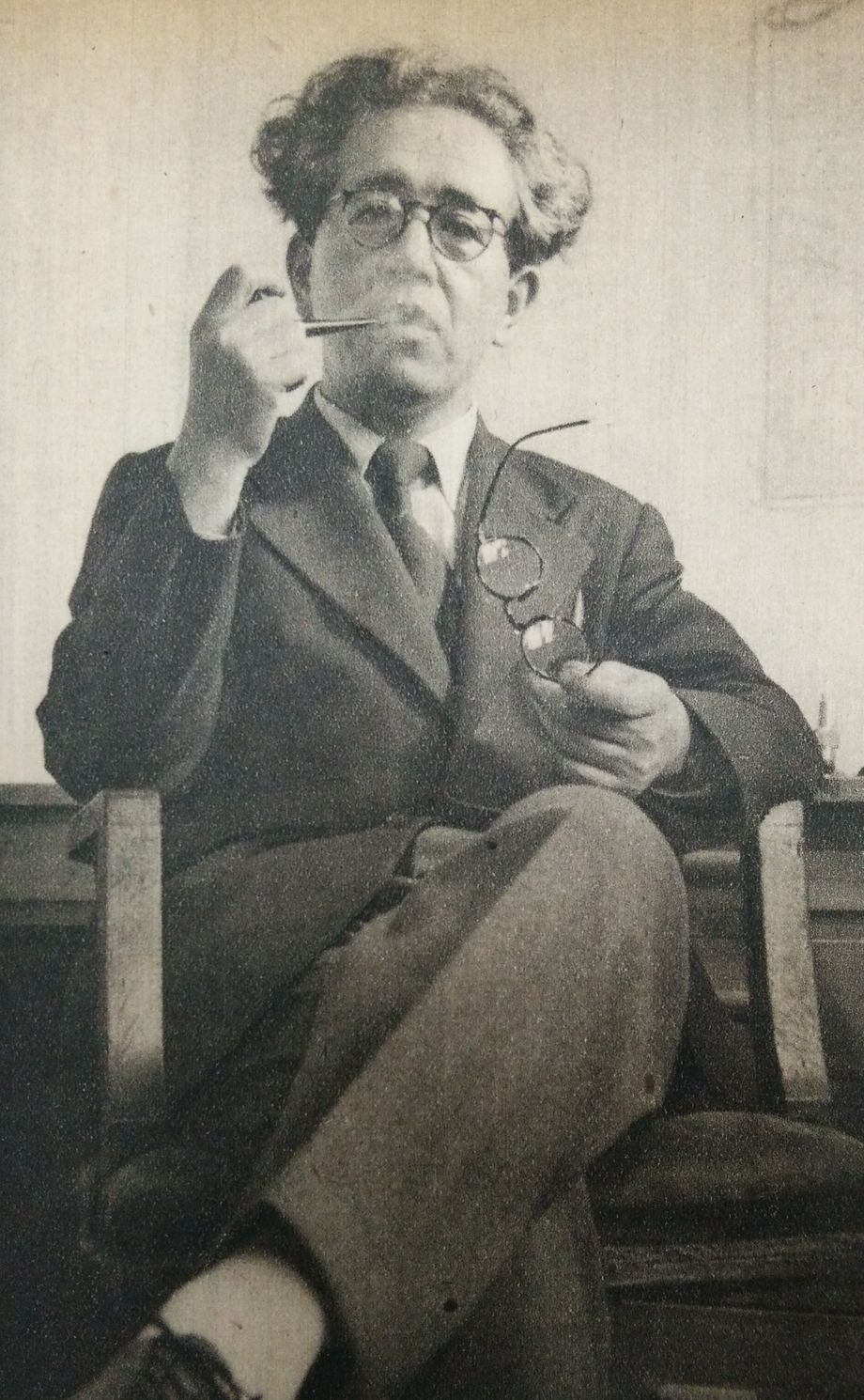
1948 photograph of Kimura from the Asahigraph magazine

Ihei Kimura (木村 伊兵衛, Kimura Ihei; 12 December 1901 – 31 May 1974) was a Japanese photographer, known for his portrayal of Tokyo and Akita Prefecture. In 1950, he was elected chairman of the newly formed Japan Professional Photographers Society.

== Life and work ==
Born on 12 December 1901 in Shitaya-ku (now Taitō-ku), Tokyo, Kimura started taking photographs when very young but his interest intensified when he was around 20 and living in Tainan, Taiwan, where he was working for a sugar wholesaler. He opened a photographic studio in Nippori, Tokyo in 1924. In 1930, he joined the advertising section of the soap and cosmetics company Kaō, concentrating on informal photographs made with his Leica camera. In 1932, Kimura was a central figure in the coterie magazine Kōga (光画; 1932–1933), which helped spur the development of Shinkō shashin (“New Photography”) in Japan. In 1933, he joined Yōnosuke Natori and others in forming the group Nippon Kōbō ("Japan workshop"), which emphasized "realism" in photography using 35mm cameras; but this rapidly broke up and Kimura formed an alternative group, Chūō Kōbō ("central workshop") with Nobuo Ina and others.

During the war, Kimura worked in Manchukuo and for the publisher Tōhō-sha. He edited Front, the propaganda photo journal of the Tōhō-sha company. He also contributed to a propaganda magazine, Shashin Shūhō, in the same period.

In 1950, Kimura was elected chairman of the newly formed Japan Professional Photographers Society (JPS); together with Ken Domon he did much to encourage a documentary spirit in amateur photography.

In the mid-fifties, Kimura made several trips to Europe, providing photographs for the camera magazines. His work was included by Edward Steichen in the world-touring 1955 MoMA exhibition The Family of Man. Pari, a collection of his color photographs of Paris, would only be published in 1974, but the use of color was ahead of its time.

On his return to Japan, Kimura concentrated on photographing rural life in Akita. He also worked on portraits, particularly of writers.

Kimura died at his home in Nippori on 31 May 1974; the Kimura Ihei Award for new photographers was promptly set up in his honor. He remains popular in Japan: samples of his photographs still (2009) regularly appear in the magazine Asahi Camera.

His work was exhibited at the Rencontres d'Arles festival in 2004.

== Publications ==
=== Books of Kimura's photographs ===
Teihon: Kimura Ihei, a 2002 "definitive edition" of Kimura's works.

- A Historical Sketch of Japanese Customs and Costumes. Tokyo: Society for International Cultural Relations (Kokusai Bunka Shinkōkai), 1936.
- Japanese School Life through the Camera. Tokyo: Society for International Cultural Relations (Kokusai Bunka Shinkōkai), 1937.
- (As "Ihee Kimura".) Japan through a Leica. Tokyo: Sanseido, 1938. One hundred photographs of Japan. Facsimile edition: Tokyo: Kokushokan, 2006. ISBN 4-336-04488-0. (NB The box that contains this expensive reprint is considerably larger than the book within it.)
- Four Japanese Painters. JPS Picture Books. JPS, 1940. In English.
- (in Japanese) Kōki nisenroppyaku-nen gōshuku geinōsai (皇紀二千六百年奉祝藝能際). Kokusai Hōdō Kōgei, 1941.
- (in Japanese) Ōdō rakudo (王道樂土). Tokyo: Ars, 1943. Photographs of Manchuria.
- Rokudaime Onoe Kikugorō butai shashinshū (六代目尾上菊五郎舞臺寫眞集, Photograph collection of the sixth Onoe Kikugorō on the stage). Kyoto: Wakei Shoten, 1949. On the kabuki actor Onoe Kikugorō VI (1885–1949).
- (in Japanese) Kimura Ihee kessaku shashinshū (木村伊兵衛傑作写真集) / Select Pictures by Ihei Kimura. Tokyo: Asahi Shinbunsha, 1954. A book of generous format (30×21 cm) that presents 132 photographs, most taking the entire page but a few in half-, quarter- or double-page format. They represent all facets of Kimura's work. The reproduction quality is of course no match for that in the posthumous collections, and what is interesting about this book is the material that the latter drop, for example three photographs from a (demure) striptease performance. Short captions in English as well as Japanese, longer explanations as well as texts by Kimura and Nobuo Ina in Japanese only.
- (in Japanese) Kimura Ihee gaiyū shashinshū: Dai ikkai (木村伊兵衛外遊写真集：第一回). Tokyo: Asahi Shinbunsha, 1955.
- (in Japanese) Kimura Ihee gaiyū shashinshū: Dai nikai: Yōroppa no inshō (木村伊兵衛外遊写真集：第二回：ヨーロッパの印象) / Impression of Europe. Tokyo: Asahi Shinbunsha, 1956.
- Zōsenjo no inshō (造船所の印象) / At a Shipyard. Sekai Shashin Sakka (世界写真作家). Tokyo: Heibonsha, 1958.
- Kimura Ihee sakuhinshū (木村伊兵衛作品集), Collected photographs of Ihei Kimura). Gendai Nihon shashin zenshū (現代日本写真全集), vol. 1. Tokyo: Sōgensha, 1959.
- Ōkawa Hashizō butai shashinshū (大川橋蔵舞台写真集, Photograph collection of Hashizō Ōkawa on the stage). Wakei Shoten, 1962. On the kabuki actor Hashizō Ōkawa (1929–84).
- (in Japanese) Zenshinza butai shashinshū (前進座舞台写真集, Photograph collection of Zenshinza on stage). Tokyo: Kenkōsha, 1966. Black and white and also some color photographs of the Zenshinza kabuki troupe on stage and off, on the occasion of the 35th anniversary of its founding.
- (in Japanese) Kimura Ihee no me (木村伊兵衛の眼, The eye of Ihei Kimura). Special issue of Asahi Camera, December 1970. A representative collection of Kimura's works, all black and white.
- (in Japanese) Kimura Ihee shashinshū: Chūgoku no tabi (木村伊兵衛写真集：中国の旅, Ihei Kimura photograph collection: Travels in China). Tokyo: Asahi Shinbunsha, 1974.
- Kimura Ihee shashinshū: Pari (木村伊兵衛写真集：パリ, Ihei Kimura photograph collection: Paris). Tokyo: Norasha, 1974. Most of the photographs are spread across facing pages (and thus split down the middle).
- (in Japanese) Akita (秋田). Nikon Salon Books 4. Tokyo: Nikkor Club, 1978. Photographs of Akita.
- Rokudaime Kikugorō: Kimura Ihee shashinshū (六代目菊五郎：木村伊兵衛写真集) / Sixth Generation Kikugoro. Sonorama Shashin Sensho 17. Tokyo: Asahi Sonorama, 1979. OCLC 835651026. On the kabuki actor Onoe Kikugorō VI (1885–1949). Substantially based on the book of 1949, but an altered selection of photographs. With a short summary in English.
- (in Japanese) Watanabe Yoshio (渡辺義雄), et al., eds. Kimura Ihee shashin zenshū: Shōwa jidai (木村伊兵衛写真全集：昭和時代, Ihei Kimura photograph collection: The Shōwa period). Tokyo: Sekaibunkasha, 1979. Three large (37 cm tall), expensive hardback volumes.
  - 1. Portraits and the stage.
  - 2. Street scenes and the countryside.
  - 3. Europe and China.
- (in Japanese) Machikado (街角, Street corners). Nikon Salon Books 7. Tokyo: Nikkor Club, 1981. Black and white photographs, mostly of Japan, but also of Europe and China, selected by a team headed by Jun Miki. There are scenes in the countryside (even fields), by the sea, and so forth. When new, this book was available to the members of the Nikkor Club; it was not sold to the public.
- (in Japanese) Watanabe Yoshio (渡辺義雄), et al., eds. Kimura Ihee shashin zenshū: Shōwa jidai (木村伊兵衛写真全集：昭和時代, Ihei Kimura photograph collection: The Shōwa period). Tokyo: Chikuma, 1984. Four large (31 cm tall), hardback volumes, still (2006) in print.
  - 1. Photographs from 1925 to 1945. ISBN 4-480-61301-3.
  - 2. Photographs from 1945 to 1953. ISBN 4-480-61302-1.
  - 3. Photographs from 1953 to 1974. ISBN 4-480-61303-X.
  - 4. Photographs of Akita Prefecture. ISBN 4-480-61304-8.
- (in Japanese) Tanuma Takeyoshi (田沼武能), ed. Kimura Ihee no Shōwa (木村伊兵衛の昭和, The Shōwa period of Ihei Kimura). Chikuma Library 39. Tokyo: Chikuma, 1990. ISBN 4-480-05139-2. An inexpensive compact (shinsho) survey still (2006) in print.
- Tanuma Takeyoshi (田沼武能), ed. Kimura Ihee: Shōwa no onna-tachi (木村伊兵衛 昭和の女たち, Ihei Kimura: The women of Shōwa). Chikuma Library 55. Tokyo: Chikuma, 1991. ISBN 4-480-05155-4.
- Kimura Ihee no sekai (木村伊兵衛の世界) / Photographs: Kimura Ihee. Tokyo: Tōkyōto Bunka Shinkōkai, 1992. Catalogue of an exhibition.
- Kimura Ihee sakuhinten: Tokyo, 1945–1968 (木村伊兵衛作品展：「東京」1945～1968年, Ihei Kimura exhibition: Tokyo, 1945–68). Tokyo: JCII Photo Salon, 1992.
- (in Japanese) Rokudaime Onoe Kikugorō: Zenseiki no meijingei (六代目尾上菊五郎：全盛期の名人芸, Sixth generation Onoe Kikugorō). Tokyo: Nihon Eizō (distributed by Bungei Shunjū), 1993. ISBN 4-89036-847-7. On the kabuki actor Onoe Kikugorō VI (1885–1949).
- Kimura Ihee to Akita ten (木村伊兵衛と秋田展, Exhibition of Ihei Kimura and Akita). Akita: Akita Senshu Museum of Art, 1994.
- (in Japanese) Tanuma Takeyoshi (田沼武能), ed. Kimura Ihee: Shōwa o utsusu (木村伊兵衛 昭和を写す, Ihei Kimura: Photographing the Shōwa period). Tokyo: Chikuma (Chikuma Bunko), 1995. An inexpensive four-volume pocket-format (bunkobon) survey still (2006) in print, based on the same publisher's four-volume set of 1984.
  - 1. Senzen to sengo (戦前と戦後, Before and after the war). ISBN 4-480-03051-4. Okinawa, 1935; Manchuria, 1940; life in Tokyo and elsewhere in Honshū, mostly 1932–41; the aftermath of the war, 1945–7; Japan, 1949–72.
  - 2. Yomigaeru toshi (よみがえる都市, The city restored). ISBN 4-480-03052-2. Tokyo 1946–73.
  - 3. Jinbutsu to butai (人物と舞台, People and the stage). ISBN 4-480-03053-0. Portraits, people at work, the traditional Japanese stage.
  - 4. Akita no minzoku (秋田の民俗, Folkways of Akita). ISBN 4-480-03054-9. Life in Akita Prefecture.
- (in Japanese) Kimura Ihee (木村伊兵衛, Ihei Kimura). Nihon no Shashinka 8. Tokyo: Iwanami Shoten, 1998. ISBN 4-00-008348-1. A concise survey within this set devoted to the Japanese pantheon.
- (in Japanese) Teihon: Kimura Ihee (定本木村伊兵衛, Ihei Kimura: The definitive edition). Tokyo: Asahi Shinbunsha, 2002. ISBN 4-02-258676-1. A large (29 cm tall), carefully produced and rather expensive collection, which has captions in English as well as Japanese, but no other English.
- Boku to Raika: Kimura Ihee kessakusen + essei (僕とライカ：木村伊兵衛傑作選＋エッセイ, Leica and me: A collection of masterpieces by Ihei Kimura, and essays). Tokyo: Asahi Shinbunsha, 2003. ISBN 4-02-257832-7.
- Kimura Ihee (木村伊兵衛) / Ihei Kimura. Kyoto: Katsuhikan and the Kyoto Museum of Contemporary Art, 2002. A compact survey of Kimura's work in Japan. Elegantly produced, but the reproduction quality is disappointing. Short captions as well as some other text in English, remaining text in Japanese only.
- Kimura Ihee-ten (木村伊兵衛展) / Ihei Kimura: The Man with the Camera. Tokyo: National Museum of Modern Art, 2004. The compact survey in this well-produced exhibition catalog includes such lesser known works as the Kaō advertisements. Captions and much of the text in English as well as Japanese.
- Tanuma Takeyoshi (田沼武能), et al. Kimura Ihee no Pari (木村伊兵衛のパリ) / Kimura Ihei in Paris: Photographs 1954–1955. Tokyo: Asahi Shinbun-sha, 2006. ISBN 4-02-250209-6. A large collection of color photographs, many of which previously appeared in Kimura Ihee shashinshū: Pari (1974). In Japanese and English.

=== Other books with works by Kimura ===
- Kogata kamera shashinjutsu (小型カメラ写真術). Seibundō Shinkōsha, 1936. Reprint. Kurashikku Kamera Sensho 25. Tokyo: Asahi Sonorama, 2002. ISBN 4-257-12035-5.
- Kogata kamera no utsushikata, tsukaikata (小型カメラの寫し方・使ひ方 [in modern script (小型カメラの写しかた・使いかた]). Tokyo: Genkōsha, 1937.
- (Joint work) Girls of Japan. JPS Picture Books. JPS, 1939. In English.
- (Joint work) (in Indonesian) Pendidikan di sekolah kebangsaan. Kokusai Bunka Shinkōkai, 1942.
- (Joint work) (in Indonesian) Peroesahaan mesin basar. Kokusai Bunka Shinkōkai, 1942.
- (with Shunkichi Kikuchi) Tōkyō sen-kyūhyaku-yonjūgonen, aki (東京一九四五年・秋) / Tokyo: Fall of 1945. Tokyo: Bunka-sha, 1946. The photographers are not credited. A stapled booklet of sepia photographs of life in Tokyo immediately after the end of the war. (The word aki in the title makes it clear that fall here means autumn, not defeat.) Text and captions in both Japanese and English.
- (in Japanese) Jūgosei Ichimura Uzaemon butai shashinshū (十五世市村羽左衛門舞臺寫眞集, Photograph collection of the fifteenth-generation Ichimura Uzaemon on the stage). Edited by 関逸雄. Kyoto: Wakei Shoten, 1951. On the kabuki actor. On the kabuki actor Ichimura Uzaemon (1874–1945). Ninety-six pages of photographs, of which pp. 21–68 are credited to Kimura (the remainder are uncredited).
- (in Japanese) (With Nakagawa Kazuo) Shashin no utsushikata (写真の撮し方, How to take photographs). Tokyo: Kaname Shobō, 1953.
- (With Nobuo Ina, edited by Yōnosuke Natori) Shashin no jōshiki. (写真の常識, Knowledge of the photograph). Tokyo: Keiyūsha, 1955.
- Kimura Ihee dokuhon (木村伊兵衛読本). Special issue of Photo Art, August 1956.
- (As editor) Jinbutsu shashin (人物写真). Asahi Camera Kōza (アサヒカメラ講座). Tokyo: Asahi Shinbunsha, 1956.
- (Edited by Kimura Ihei and Nakajima Kenzō) Bungakusha no mita gendai no Chūgoku shashinshū (文学者のみた現代の中国写真集, Photograph collection of today's China as seen by writers). Tokyo: Mainichi Shinbunsha, 1960.
- Kimura Ihee no sekai (木村伊兵衛の世界, The world of Ihei Kimura). Special issue of Asahi Camera, August 1974.
- (in Japanese) Sengo shashin / Saisei to tenkai (戦後写真・再生と展開) / Twelve Photographers in Japan, 1945–55. Yamaguchi Kenritsu Bijutsukan, 1990. Despite the alternative title in English, almost exclusively in Japanese (although each of the twelve has a potted chronology in English). Twenty of Kimura's photographs of Akita appear on pp. 36–46.
- Taidan: Shashin kono gojūnen (対談：写真この五十年, Conversations: The last fifty years of photography). By the editors of Asahi Camera. Tokyo: Asahi Shinbunsha, 1974. A collection of transcriptions of Kimura's discussions with various photographers and others concerned with photography.
- Kimura Ihee (木村伊兵衛) / Special Issue: Ihei Kimura. Nikkor Club, no. 70, Autumn 1974.
- (in Japanese) Kimura Ihee o yomu (木村伊兵衛を読む, Reading Ihei Kimura). Asahi Camera special edition. Tokyo: Asahi Shinbunsha, 1979. In Japanese only, but very substantial and contains a handy reference to Kimura's very numerous contributions to the magazine. (A special production by the Asahi Camera, prominently dated December 1979 and looking at first like that month's issue: but there was also a separate, regular issue for the month.)
- Association to Establish the Japan Peace Museum, ed. Ginza to sensō (銀座と戦争) / Ginza and the War. Tokyo: Atelier for Peace, 1986. ISBN 4-938365-04-9 Kimura is one of ten photographers — the others are Ken Domon, Shigeo Hayashi, Tadahiko Hayashi, Kōyō Ishikawa, Kōyō Kageyama, Shunkichi Kikuchi, Kōji Morooka, Minoru Ōki, and Maki Sekiguchi — who provide 340 photographs for this well-illustrated and large photographic history of Ginza from 1937 to 1947. Captions and text in both Japanese and English.
- (Joint work) Bunshi no shōzō hyakujūnin (文士の肖像一一〇人, Portraits of 110 literati). Tokyo: Asahi Shinbunsha, 1990. ISBN 4-02-258466-1. Kimura is one of five photographers — the others are Shōtarō Akiyama, Ken Domon, Hiroshi Hamaya, and Tadahiko Hayashi.
- (in Japanese) Mishima Yasushi (三島靖). Kimura Ihee to Domon Ken: Shashin to sono shōgai (木村伊兵衛と土門拳：写真とその生涯, Ihei Kimura and Ken Domon: Photography and biography). Tokyo: Heibonsha, 1995. ISBN 4-582-23107-1. Reprint. Heibonsha Library. Tokyo: Heibonsha, 2004. ISBN 4-582-76488-6.
- (in Japanese) Kimura Ihee no renzu: Sunappushotto wa kō tore! ( 木村伊兵衛の眼：スナップショットはこう撮れ！, The lens of Ihei Kimura: Here's how to take snapshots!). Taiyō (太陽) / The Sun, July 1999. Republished as a book in 2007.
- Dokyumentarī no jidai: Natori Yōnosuke, Kimura Ihee, Domon Ken, Miki Jun no shashin kara (ドキュメンタリーの時代：名取洋之助・木村伊兵衛・土門 拳・三木淳の写真から) / The Documentary Age: Photographs by Natori Younosuke, Kimura Ihei, Domon Ken, and Miki Jun. Tokyo: Tokyo Metropolitan Museum of Photography, 2001. An exhibition catalogue. The book reproduces 28 of Kimura's photographs of Akita. Captions in both Japanese and English, other text in Japanese only.
- Hiraki, Osamu, and Keiichi Takeuchi. Japan, a Self-Portrait: Photographs 1945–1964. Paris: Flammarion, 2004. ISBN 2-08-030463-1 Kimura is one of eleven photographers whose works appear in this large book (the others are Ken Domon, Hiroshi Hamaya, Tadahiko Hayashi, Eikoh Hosoe, Yasuhiro Ishimoto, Kikuji Kawada, Shigeichi Nagano, Ikkō Narahara, Takeyoshi Tanuma, and Shōmei Tōmatsu).
- Kindai shashin no umi no oya: Kimura Ihee to Domon Ken (近代写真の生みの親：木村伊兵衛と土門拳) / Kimura Ihei and Domon Ken. Tokyo: Asahi Shinbunsha and Mainichi Shinbunsha, 2004. Catalogue of an exhibition.
- (in Japanese) Kimura Ihee no renzu: Sunappushotto wa kō tore! (木村伊兵衛の眼：スナップショットはこう撮れ！, The lens of Ihei Kimura: Here's how to take snapshots!). Tokyo: Heibonsha, 2007. ISBN 978-4-582-63428-0. Reworked from the July 1999 issue of Taiyō: an economical, compact collection of photographs by (and of) Kimura, essays about him by prominent photographers (such as Kineo Kuwabara, Yutaka Takanashi and Nobuyoshi Araki), and such extras as an illustrated bibliography.
