= All-Japan Students' Photo Association =

Japanese photo club association

The All-Japan Students’ Photo Association (AJSPA) (全日本学生写真連盟), also known as 全日 (Zen-nichi), was a nationwide federation of university and high school photography clubs established in 1953. At its peak, it united over 100 universities and 900 high schools, and over 34,000 student photographers. Throughout the 1950s and 60s it developed one of the most ambitious experiments in collective action in postwar Japan seeking to use photography not simply as documentary or artistic expression, but as a means of social and political engagement.

== Establishment ==
The origins of Zen-nichi can be traced to the proliferation of amateur photography clubs in Japan during the early 20th century. As cameras became more affordable, photography clubs spread throughout the country and, by the 1930s, had become established at universities and high schools. Photography historian Ryuichi Kaneko identifies student photography clubs at institutions including Kwansei Gakuin University, Konan High School, Meiji University, and Aichi University as important predecessors to Zen-nichi.

Established in 1953, Zen-nichi sought to serve as a pan-organization to connect these student photography clubs into a nationwide network. Based in the office of Fuji Photo Film, the organization promoted photography through exhibition competitions, training camps, workshops and regular lectures and critiques by leading photographers such as Domon Ken and Kimura Ihei. The photography critic Fukushima Tatsuo also became one of the organization’s most influential mentors, particularly from the mid-1960s onward.

Zen-nichi was deeply influenced by the postwar realism associated with Domon Ken, which was laid out in his writings in Camera magazine starting around 1950, expressing his idea that photography should confront reality, encouraging photographers to depict wounded soldiers, the poor, and others affected by the aftermath of the war. Zen-nichi was also influenced by the emergence of later photographers such as Tōmatsu Shōmei, Kawada Kikuji, and Hosoe Eikoh, who challenged the increasingly formulaic character of Domon’s realism. Zen-nichi would continue to reinterpret this engagement with contemporary social issues through its own collaborative photographic practices.

By 1959, the organization had grown to include photography clubs at 113 universities and 932 high schools, representing approximately 34,000 student photographers, making it one of the largest student photographer organizations in post-war Japan.

== Reassessment of Zen-nichi ==
Zen-nichi has received renewed scholarly attention in recent years. Photography by its members was featured in the 2013 exhibition Japanese Photography, 1968 at the Tokyo Photographic Art Museum. In the exhibition catalog, photography historian Ryuichi Kaneko argues that its work has occupied only a marginal place within histories of Japanese photography because of its collective nature and absence of individual artistic authorship.

Zen-nichi was also featured in the exhibition PROVOKE: Between Protest and Performance—Japanese Photography 1960/1975, where its photographs and photobooks were presented as part of the broader history of protest photography in postwar Japan.

Zen-nichi’s activities have also been reassessed through regional histories of Japanese photography. For example, the 2021 exhibition The Movement of Modern Photography in Nagoya 1911-1972 included the Chūbu Student Photography Association, examining collective photographic practices and student movements, in the broader historical context of postwar photographic collectives.

This reevaluation and research have been facilitated by the establishment of the Archieves of Another Japanese Photo Stream (AAJPS), an online archive maintained by former members. The archive provides free access to photobooks and other primary source materials.

== Methodology ==
=== Kyōdō seisaku ("collective production") ===
Inspired by Dōmon Ken’s ideas around photographic realism to confront social issues, members of the Rikkyo University Photography Club, led by Kawada Kikuji, developed the method of kyōdō seisaku (“collective production”). This approach was subsequently adopted by many other photography clubs throughout Zen-nichi. Members selected a common social theme, conducted fieldwork together, and engaged in extensive discussion before and after photographing to develop a shared understanding of their subject. Collaboration extended beyond the production of photographs themselves to the collective intellectual process through which they were conceived, discussed, and interpreted.

By the early 1960s, however, the methodology had begun to stagnate. Because projects increasingly began from agreed-upon political positions, photography often became a means of illustrating predetermined conclusions. As a result, the individuality of the photographer was frequently subordinated to the objectives of the group, leading some former members to criticize aspects of the methodology as authoritarian.

=== Shūdan satsuei kōdō ("Group Photography Action") ===
Seeking to overcome these limitations, members of the Meiji University’s Camera Club began discussions with photography critic Tatsuo Fukushima in 1965 about how the Zen-nichi might rethink its approach. Fukushima encouraged students to reconsider not only what should be photographed but also the photographer’s own subjectivity and relationship to reality. This self-reflective approach was first explored in the photobook Jōkyō 1965 (“Situation 1965”), which emphasized the photographer’s own participation in the realities they sought to document.

This rethinking gradually developed into what later came to be called shūdan satsuei kōdō (“Group Photography Action”). Unlike kyōdō seisaku, which emphasized collaboration in producing a finished work, this new methodology encouraged individual photographers to confront reality directly before bringing their experiences back to the group, where they were collectively discussed and situated within broader social and historical contexts. The methodology sought to investigate the interconnected nature of what the photographers were shooting and the underlying historical structures.

The terminology itself was never entirely fixed. Former members disagree about precisely when the terms kyōdō seisaku and shūdan satsuei kōdō began to be used. Many acknowledge that these labels have been applied retrospectively. But these words represent an evolving set of methodologies and practices that developed through experimentation during the 1960s.

This evolution unfolded alongside broader political and social movements including the anti-Vietnam War movement, women’s liberation, student activism, and protests against large-scale development projects. Zen-nichi campaigns such as Hokkaidō 10.21 sought to examine social issues within longer histories of war, colonialism, capitalism, and modernization. Zen-nichi newsletters encouraged members to recognize the interconnectedness of everyday life and global politics. One frequently cited example asked students to consider how a medium-sized factory manufacturing dual-use industrial products was indirectly implicated in the Vietnam War, demonstrating how local economic activity was intertwined with global contexts.

== Campaigns ==
Zen-nichi’s evolving methodology was applied to a series of nationwide anti-pollution campaigns during the late 1960s and early 1970s. While photographers such as Domon Ken, Tomatsu Shomei, and Kuwabara Shisei had already documented such environmental disasters as individual photographers, Zen-nichi approached pollution as a collective to maximize the impact of their activism. Zen-nichi photo clubs traveled to various sites such as Minamata, Yokkaichi, Fuji, and Ashio. They combined photography with interviews, archival research, and historical documents.

As Kelly Midori McCormick observes:

At pollution sites across Japan, students created theoretically informed photographic methods prior to and in tandem with the experimental photographer of well-known collectives such as Provoke that became internationally famous for its grainy, out-of-focus style that challenged the ontological nature of the photographic document.

They published pamphlets, photobooks, newsletters, and held exhibitions, expanding documentary photography to mobilize political action. The projects sought to expose the structural relationship between industrial development, state, policy, environmental destruction, and everyday life.

=== Ashio 1969-1971 ===
This campaign was undertaken over three years by twenty women photographers from the Tokyo Jissen Women’s College Photography Club. Their project documents one of Japan’s earliest and most significant industrial sites. Rather than simply photographing the region, the photographers immersed themselves in the local community, interviewing residents, bathing alongside them, and learning the complex social and environmental history of the area.

The resulting photographs record the enduring environmental damage caused by the intensive production at the Ashio Copper Mine while also portraying the everyday lives of those who remain there. Images of children playing, local residents, and historical photos of Tanaka Shōzō, a pioneer of environmental activism, are interwoven with stark landscapes scarred by mining, emphasizing the tension between environmental devastation and the resilience of human life.

Ashio’s historical significance as a site of environmental activism profoundly influenced the anti-pollution campaigns led by the All-Japan Students’ Association. Kelly Midori McCormick argues that the project constructs a narrative of historical continuity between environmental movements at the turn of the 20th century and those of the 1960s and 70s.

In an interview with McCormick, one member of the Jissen Women’s Photography Club explained that rather than participating in the violent protests of the period, she and her fellow club members chose the camera as their “chosen form of protest.”

Although the photographs were made between 1969 and 1971, they were assembled retrospectively and published as a photobook in 1994.

=== Kono chijō ni wareware no kuni ha nai (この地上にわれわれの国はない) ("On this Land We Have no Country") ===
Published in 1970, Kono chijo ni wareware no kuni ha nai (“On This Land We Have No Country”) brings together photographs of pollution sites including Minamata, Yokkaichi, and Ashio taken by members of photography clubs affiliated with Zen-nichi. The title references environmental activist Shōzō Tanaka who declared before the Diet on February 17, 1900, “You are in a destroyed Japan… on this land we have no country.” His words are reproduced on the inside cover of the photobook.

The project represented the new methodology of shūdan satsuei kōdō (“Group Photography Action”). Preparations began in June 1970, followed by a national training camp in early July where the project was planned. Photographs were made across Japan during a coordinated ten-day period in late August. After a second national training camp in September, additional locations requiring further shooting were identified, and the photobook was completed two months later in November. Approximately 80 to 120 members participated.

The resulting publication was very thin and printed in large quantities so that it could be sold on street corners. Unlike conventional photojournalism, photographs of mining towns, industrial zones, and fishing villages were combined with statistics, victims’ testimonies, historical documents, maps, and petitions to the Ministry of International Trade and Industry.

Kelly Midori McCormick argues that the campaign sought to expose the victims of Japan’s postwar economic growth while revealing the structural collusion between the government and industry. By bringing together photographs from pollution sites across the country, the photobook transformed what had been understood as isolated environmental disasters into a nationwide and interconnected crisis, collectively forming what the group described as a “pollution map” of Japan.

The photobook consciously positioned itself within the longer tradition of environmental activism. Alongside references to Tanaka Shōzō, it juxtaposes photographs of Minamata victims with passages from Ishimure Michiko's Kugai jōdo: waga Minamata-byō ("Paradise in the Sea of Sorrow") (1969), while photographs of polluted landscapes and industrial facilities were presented alongside apartment blocks, urban skylines, and symbols of postwar prosperity. These montages implicated viewers within the economic and social systems responsible for environmental destruction. This was reinforced by a manifesto printed inside the cover calling readers to participate in anti-pollution activism.

Taken as a whole, McCormick describes the photobook as a “condemnation of the last 100 years of Japanese history and an incitement to break the ongoing sequence of ‘madness and aggression of capital’ that had led Japan to attempt to escape from Asia by colonizing it and then aggressively pursuing industrial capitalism.”

Ayumu Tajiri similarly argues that the photobook can be seen as a “history from below.” He also points to the photographs in the photobook regarding the Kamioka Mine and its cadmium contamination of the Jinzu River caused by the Mitsui Mining company, focused on women across generations with text that connects the environmental damage to patriarchal social structures under which they lived. Throughout the volume, residents appear not merely as victims but as political actors engaged in resistance, reinforcing the Zen-nichi’s commitment to collective action.

=== HIROSHIMA, Hiroshima, hírou-ʃíma ===
Hiroshima Day was one of the earliest large-scale projects to emerge from the Zen-nichi’s methodical reforms of 1965 and is an important precursor to what later became known as shūdan satsuei kōdō (“Group Photography Action”). Between 1968 and 1971, more than 50 participants carried out 11 photographic campaigns in Hiroshima culminating in the publication HIROSHIMA, Hiroshima, hírou-ʃímə in 1972. Rather than treating Hiroshima solely as a site of atomic bombing, the project examined the relationship between bombing, postwar urban development, Japanese imperialism, and contemporary society.

Central to the project was the concept of hírou-ʃímə, written in phonetic notation rather than kanji or katakana. Tajiri explains that the project distinguished between HIROSHIMA, the universal symbol of the atomic bombing; Hiroshima, the post-war city shaped by state power and modernization; and hírou-ʃímə, which referred to the broader historical reality connecting these two while also implicating the photographers themselves. By emphasizing the spoken rather than the written form of the work, the notation foregrounded the photographer’s own embodied experience and suggested that confronting Hiroshima also required confronting oneself.

Although the resulting photobook remains the project’s best-known outcome, Tajiri emphasizes that it only represents one interpretation of Hiroshima Day. Unlike Kono chijō no kuni wa nai, the photobook contains almost no captions or explanatory texts, making its meaning difficult to reconstruct without additional archival material. Moreover, because Tatsuo Fukushima largely oversaw the editing rather than the participants collectively determining it, the publication does not fully convey the individual experiences, discussions, and differing interpretations that shaped the four-year campaign. The accompanying exhibition at MEM in Tokyo addressed this limitation by presenting participants’ photographic journals, original prints, and contemporaneous documents alongside the photobook, revealing Hiroshima Day as a collective photographic practice that extended beyond the published volume itself.

=== Hokkaido 101 ===
Initiated in the early 1970s, Hokkaido 101 was one of the later projects to emerge from Zen-nichi’s shūdan satsuei kōdō (“Group Photography Action”). Following Hiroshima Day and the nationwide pollution campaign, the project sought to reexamine the history of Hokkaidō’s internal colonization, reflecting Zen-nichi’s shift towards deeper historical structures of modern society. Hokkaido 101 remained unfinished, and much of its photographic material has never been publicly released.
