= Shōmei Tōmatsu =

Japanese photographer

Shōmei Tōmatsu (東松 照明, Tōmatsu Shōmei; January 16, 1930 – December 14, 2012) was a Japanese photographer. He is known primarily for his images that depict the impact of World War II on Japan and the subsequent occupation of U.S. forces. As one of the leading postwar photographers, Tōmatsu is attributed with influencing the younger generations of photographers including those associated with the magazine Provoke (Takuma Nakahira and Daido Moriyama).

== Biography ==
=== Youth ===
Tōmatsu was born in Nagoya in 1930. As an adolescent during World War II, he was mobilized to support Japan's war effort. Like many Japanese students his age, he was sent to work at a steel factory and underwent incessant conditioning intended to instill fear and hatred towards the British and Americans. Once the war ended and Allied troops took over numerous Japanese cities, Tōmatsu interacted with Americans firsthand and found that his preconceptions of them were not entirely salient. At the time Tōmatsu's contempt for the violence and crimes committed by these soldiers was complicated by individual acts of kindness he received from them – he simultaneously loved and hated their presence. These interactions, which he later described as among the most formative memories of his childhood, initiated his long-standing fixation on and feelings of ambivalence towards the subject of American soldiers.

=== Early career (1950s) ===
Tōmatsu embraced photography while an economics student at Aichi University. While still in university, his photographs were shown frequently in monthly amateur competitions by Camera magazine and received recognition from Ihei Kimura and Ken Domon. After graduating in 1954, he joined Iwanami Shashin Bunko, through an introduction made by Aichi University professor Mataroku Kumaza. Tōmatsu contributed photographs to the issues Floods and the Japanese (1954) and Pottery Town, Seto Aichi (1954). He stayed at Iwanami for two years before leaving to pursue freelance work.

In 1957, Tōmatsu participated in the exhibition Eyes of Ten where he displayed his series Barde Children's School; he was featured in the exhibit twice more when it was held again in 1958 and 1959. After his third showing, Tōmatsu established the short-lived photography collective VIVO with fellow Eyes of Ten exhibitors; these other members included Eikoh Hosoe, Kikuji Kawada, Ikkō Narahara, Akira Satō, and Akira Tanno.

Towards the end of the 1950s, Tōmatsu began photographing Japanese towns with major American bases, a project that would span over 10 years.

=== 1960s ===
Tōmatsu's artistic output and renown grew significantly during the 1960s, exemplified by his prolific engagements with many prominent Japanese photography magazines. He began the decade by publishing his images of U.S. bases in the magazines Asahi Camera and Camera Mainichi and his series Home in Photo Art. In contrast to his earlier style which resembled traditional photojournalism, Tōmatsu was beginning to develop a highly expressionistic form of image taking that emphasized the photographer's own subjectivity. In response to this emergence, a dispute arose when Iwanami Shashin Bunko founder Yonosuke Natori wrote that Tōmatsu had betrayed his foundations as a photojournalist by neglecting the responsibility to present reality in a truthful and legible manner. He rejected the claim that he was ever a photojournalist, and admonished journalistic thinking as an impediment to photography. Both essays were published in Asahi Camera. In addition to Asahi Camera and Photo Art, Tōmatsu worked for magazines Gendai no me and Camera Mainichi. For Gendai no me, he edited a monthly series titled I am King (1964); for Camera Mainichi, he printed multiple collaborations made with Yasuhiro Ishimoto and Shigeichi Nagano in 1965 and his own series, The Sea Around Us in 1966.

Later histories of photography in Nagoya have described Tōmatsu as an especially influential figure for his home city in the 1960s, noting both his role in founding the Chūbu Student Photo Federation and the broader impact of his work on subsequent student photography movements there.

==== Nagasaki ====
In 1960, Tōmatsu was commissioned to photograph Nagasaki by the Japan Council against Atomic and Hydrogen Bombs (原水爆禁止日本協議会, abbrev. Gensuikyō), after the conference determined that visual images were necessary to show international audiences the effects of the atomic bomb. The following year, Tōmatsu was guided around Nagasaki, having the opportunity to speak with and photograph victims of the atomic bomb, also known as hibakusha. Like many Japanese people at the time, Tōmatsu had only cursory knowledge about the devastation. He found that the shock of the hibakusha's appearance initially made photographing them extremely difficult. Tōmatsu's images of Nagasaki and its hibakusha were joined with Ken Domon's photographs of Hiroshima to create Tōmatsu's first critically acclaimed book Hiroshima, Nagasaki, Document, 1961. In the same year, Tōmatsu was named Photographer of the Year by the Japan Photo Critics Association.

The subject of a recovering Nagasaki and its hibakusha were revisited at various points in Tōmatsu's career. He returned to Nagasaki on numerous occasions and released the book <11:02> Nagasaki in 1966. In an interview with Linda Hoaglund and in the revised introduction to his book <11:02> Nagasaki, he spoke on the greater attention paid in this second book towards the impact of the atomic bomb on the Catholic community in Nagasaki, which greatly differed from the hibakusha in Hiroshima. His interest in Nagasaki's Catholic history was one component in his investigation of Nagasaki's development into a 20th-century city. Tōmatsu would move to Nagasaki in 1988.

==== Shaken ====
After Tōmatsu's publisher Shashin Dōjinsha folded and <11:02> Nagasaki encountered unexpectedly poor sales, Tomatsu founded his own publishing company Shaken in 1967. Through Shaken, Tōmatsu published Nippon (1967), a collection of images from ten series that was initially meant to be split into three individual books; Assalamu Alaykum (1968), images taken from his 1963 trip in Afghanistan; and Oh! Shinjuku (1969), a mix of scenes from Shinjuku's energetic nightlife, intimate scenes of Butoh performer Hijikata Ankoku, and large scale student protests against the Vietnam War held by Zengakuren.

With his publishing company, Tōmatsu also conceived the cultural magazine KEN. Each of the three issues was edited by a different artist: the first, second, and third edited by Yoshio Sawano, Masatoshi Naitō, and Tsunehisa Kimura respectively. KEN addressed concerns over a growing fascist tendency in Japan and expressed criticisms about the 1970 World Fair held in Osaka. Essays, both textual and visual, were contributed by Provoke members and other prominent Japanese photographers including Masahisa Fukase and Kazuo Kitai.

==== A Century of Photography exhibition ====
Tōmatsu's early efforts to promote photography in his home country, such as the launch of VIVO or his work as a professor at Tama Art Academy (1965) and Tokyo Zokei University (1966–1973), led to his role as an exhibition organizer for the influential show, Shashin hyakunen: Nihonjin ni yoru shashin hyōgen no rekishi (写真100年 日本人による写真表現の歴史, A Century of Photography: A Historical Exhibition of Photographic Expression by the Japanese). The exhibition was part of an initiative by the Japan Professional Photographers Society to construct a history of Japanese photography for the first time. It was co-organized with Takuma Nakahira and Kōji Taki and held at the Seibu department store in Ikebukuro in June.

=== 1970s ===
==== Okinawa ====
Tōmatsu first went to Okinawa to photograph the American bases under the auspices of Asahi Camera in 1969. The images he captured formed the book Okinawa, Okinawa Okinawa which served as an explicit critique of the American air force. On the cover, an anti-base slogan verbalizing his disdain with the overwhelming U.S. presence in Okinawa reads: 沖縄に基地があるのではなく基地の中に沖縄がある (The bases are not in Okinawa; Okinawa is in the bases). This sentiment was foreshadowed in Tōmatsu's earlier writings, like his 1964 essay for Camera Manichi in which he stated "it would not be strange to call [Japan] the State of Japan in the United States of America. That's how far America has penetrated inside Japan, how deeply it has plumbed our daily lives."

Tōmatsu visited Okinawa three more times before finally moving to Naha in 1972. While in Okinawa, he travelled to various remote islands including Iriomote and Hateruma; he spent seven months on Miyakojima where he organized a study group called "Miyako University" aimed at mentoring young Miyako residents. Combined with his images taken in Southeast Asia, Tōmatsu's photographs of Okinawa from the 1970s were shown in his prizewinning Pencil of the Sun (1975). Although he had come to Okinawa in order to witness its return to Japanese territory, Pencil of the Sun revealed a considerable shift away from the subject of military bases that he pursued throughout 1960s. He credited a diminishing interest in the American armed forces, in addition to the allure of Okinawa's brilliantly colored landscapes, for his adoption of color photography.

==== Return to mainland ====
In 1974, Tōmatsu returned to Tokyo where he set up Workshop Photo School, an alternative two-year-long workshop (1974–76), with Eikoh Hosoe, Nobuyoshi Araki, Masahisa Fukase, Daidō Moriyama, and Noriaki Yokosuka; the school published the photo magazine Workshop. Tomatsu's dedication to nurturing the photography community in Japan was also evidenced in his role as a juror for the Southern Japan Photography Exhibition and his membership in the Photographic Society of Japan's committee to create a national museum of photography. The efforts of this group led to the establishment of photography departments at major national museums, such as Yokohama Museum of Art and the National Museum of Modern Art, Tokyo, as well as the first photography museum in Japan, Tokyo Photographic Art Museum.

Tōmatsu took part in his first major international show, New Japanese Photography (1974) at MoMA New York, alongside workshop members Hosoe, Moriyama, Fukase, and 11 other photographers. New Japanese Photography was the first survey of contemporary Japanese photographers undertaken outside of Japan. It traveled to eight other locations in the United States including the Denver Art Museum, San Francisco Museum of Art, and Portland Art Museum.

By 1980, Tōmatsu published three more books: Scarlet Dappled Flower (1976) and The Shining Wind (1979) were composed of his images from Okinawa; and Kingdom of Mud (1978) featured his Afghanistan series printed earlier in Assalamu Alaykum.

=== Late career (1980s and 1990s) ===
In the early 1980s, Tomatsu had his first international solo exhibition, Shomei Tomatsu: Japan 1952-1981 shown at thirty venues over three years. He was also included in notable international group exhibitions regarding Japanese art: in 1985, he was one of the main artists in Black Sun: The Eyes of Four first shown at the Museum of Modern Art, Oxford; in 1994, he was featured in the seminal show Japanese Art After 1945: Scream Against the Sky at the Yokohama Museum of Art, Guggenheim Museum and San Francisco Museum of Modern Art.

==== Sakura + Plastics ====
Due to existing heart problems, Tōmatsu received heart bypass surgery in 1986 and moved to Chiba as part of his recovery. While in Chiba, he roamed the beaches near his home and photographed the debris that washed up onto on the black sand shores; the resulting photo series was titled Plastics. Around the same time, he developed his Sakura series which first featured in Asahi Camera (1983) then released as the book Sakura Sakura Sakura (1990). Tomatsu notes how his surgery shifted his interest in the question of survival and mortality, with Plastics and Sakura demonstrating his increasingly allusive approach towards these themes.

In 1992, the series was shown together in Sakura + Plastics at the Metropolitan Museum of Art, making it the museum's first solo exhibition for a living Japanese artist.

=== Final years (2000–2012) ===
In the last decade of his career, Tōmatsu embarked on a new and comprehensive series of retrospectives, dividing his oeuvre into five "mandalas" of place. Each mandala was named after the area it was exhibited: Nagasaki Mandala (Nagasaki Prefectural Art Museum, 2000); Okinawa Mandala (Urasoe Art Museum, 2002); Kyoto Mandala (Kyoto National Museum of Modern Art, 2003); Aichi Mandala (Aichi Prefectural Museum of Art, 2006); and Tokyo Mandala (Tokyo Metropolitan Museum of Photography, 2007)

Tōmatsu also had a separate retrospective, Shomei Tomatsu: Skin of the Nation, for the international museum circuit. Skin of the Nation was organized by the San Francisco Museum of Modern Art, and curated by Sandra S. Phillips and the photographer and writer Leo Rubinfien. The exhibition toured three countries and five venues from 2004 through 2006: Japan Society (New York); National Gallery of Canada, Corcoran Museum of Art, San Francisco Museum of Modern Art, and Fotomuseum Winterthur.

In 2010 Tōmatsu moved to Okinawa permanently, where he held the final exhibition during his lifetime, Tomatsu Shomei and Okinawa - Love Letter to the Sun (2011). He succumbed to pneumonia on 14 December 2012 (although this was not publicly announced until January 2013).

== Selected exhibitions ==
=== Solo exhibitions ===
- What Now!?: Japan through the Eyes of Shōmei Tōmatsu, 1981. (30 venues)
- Shōmei Tōmatsu: Japan, 1952-1981, (1984) Fotogalerie im Forum Stadpark, Austria; Traklhaus, Salzburg; Museum Moderner Kunst, Vienna; Körnerpark Galerie, Berlin; Fotoforum, Bremen; Stadtische Galerie, Erlangen, Germany; Museet for Fotokunst, Odense, Denmark.
- Sakura + Plastics, Metropolitan Museum of Art, 1992
- Traces: Fifty Years of Tōmatsu's Work, Tokyo Metropolitan Museum, 1999
- Mandala Retrospectives (2000-2007)
  - Nagasaki Mandala (Nagasaki Prefectural Art Museum, 2000)
  - Okinawa Mandala (Urasoe Art Museum, 2002)
  - Kyoto Mandala (Kyoto National Museum of Modern Art, 2003)
  - Aichi Mandala (Aichi Prefectural Museum of Art, 2006)
  - Tokyo Mandala (Tokyo Metropolitan Museum of Photography, 2007)
- Shomei Tomatsu: Skin of the Nation (2004–2006), Japan Society, New York (September 2004 – January 2005), National Gallery of Canada, Ottawa (January – April), Corcoran Museum of Art, Washington, D.C. (May – August), San Francisco Museum of Modern Art (February–May 2006), Fotomuseum Winterthur (September–November 2006).
- Shomei Tomatsu, Fundación Mapfre Casa Garriga Nogués, Barcelona, June–September 2018. The first Tomatsu retrospective in Spain.

=== Group exhibitions ===
- Eyes of Ten, Konishiroku Photo Gallery, Tokyo 1957, 1958, 1959.
- New Japanese Photography, Museum of Modern Art, New York, March–May 1974 Denver Art Museum; Saint Louis Art Museum; Minneapolis Institute of the Arts; Winnipeg Art Gallery; Kranner Art Museum; University of Illinois at Urbana-Champaign; San Francisco Museum of Modern Art; Seattle Art Museum; Portland Art Museum
- Black Sun: The Eyes of Four, Museum of Modern Art, Oxford, 1985. Travelled to Serpentine Gallery, London; University of Iowa Museum of Art; Japan House Gallery, New York; Museum of Contemporary Art, Los Angeles; Baltimore Museum of Art.
- Japanese Art After 1945: Scream Against the Sky (1994), Yokohama Museum of Art, Guggenheim Museum; San Francisco Museum of
- Island Life, Art Institute of Chicago, Chicago, IL, September 2013 – January 2014

== Awards ==
- 1958: Newcomer's Award, Japan Photo Critics Association
- 1961: Photographer of the Year, Japan Photo Critics Association
- 1975: Annual Award for Pencil of the Sun, Photographic Society of Japan
- 1976: Mainichi Art Award
- 1976: Science and Culture's Art Encouragement Award Minister of Education
- 1995: Purple Ribbon Medal, Japanese government
- 1997: St. James Modern Masterpiece Award
- 1999: Japan Art Grand Prix, Shincho Awards
- 2003: Chunichi Culture Award
- 2005: Distinguished Contributions Award, Photographic Society of Japan

== Books of Tōmatsu's works ==
=== Books by Tōmatsu and compilations of his works ===
- Suigai to nihonjin (水害と日本人, Floods and the Japanese). Iwanami Shashin Bunko 124. Tokyo: Iwanami Shoten, 1954. Joint work. The photographs are reproduced within Aichi Mandala (2006).
- Yakimono no machi: Seto (焼き物の町：瀬戸, Pottery town: Seto). Iwanami Shashin Bunko 165. Tokyo: Iwanami Shoten, 1955. The photographs are reproduced within Aichi Mandala (2006).
- Hiroshima–Nagasaki Document 1961. Tokyo: Japan Council against A- and H-Bombs. With Ken Domon.
- "11 ji 02 fun" Nagasaki (＜11時02分＞Nagasaki, "11:02" Nagasaki). Tokyo: Shashin Dōjinsha, 1966.
- Nippon (日本, Japan). Tokyo: Shaken, 1967.
- Sarāmu areikomu (サラーム・アレイコム, Assalamu Alaykum). Tokyo: Shaken, 1968. Photographs of Afghanistan, taken in August 1963.
- Ō! Shinjuku (おお!新宿, Oh! Shinjuku). Tokyo: Shaken, 1969.
- Okinawa Okinawa Okinawa (Okinawa沖縄Okinawa). Tokyo: Shaken, 1969.
- Sengoha (戦後派). Tokyo: Chūōkōronsha, 1971. Tokyo: Gurabia Seikōsha, 1971.
- I Am a King. Tokyo: Shashinhyōronsha, 1972.
- Taiyō no empitsu (新編 太陽の鉛筆, Pencil of the Sun). Tokyo: Mainichi, 1975.
- Akemodoro no hana (朱もどろの華, Scarlet Dappled Flower). Tokyo: Sanseidō, 1976.
- Doro no Ōkoku (泥の王国, Kingdom of Mud). Sonorama Shashin Sensho 12. Tokyo: Asahi Sonorama, 1978. Text in English and Japanese. A reworking of the material published earlier in Sarāmu areikomu.
- Hikaru kaze (光る風：沖縄, Sparkling Winds: Okinawa). Nihon no Bi. Tokyo: Shūeisha, 1979. Text in Japanese. A large-format (37 cm high) book of color photographs of Okinawa. A supplementary colophon gives publication details in English (including the only mention of the English title), but all the explanations and other texts are in Japanese only.
- Shōwa shashin: Zenshigoto 15: Tōmatsu Shōmei (昭和写真・全仕事：東松照明). Tokyo: Asahi Shinbunsha, 1984. One in a series of books of which each is devoted to the entire career of a single photographer.
- Shomei Tomatsu, Japan 1952–1981. Graz: Edition Camera Austria; Vertrieb, Forum Stadtpark Graz, 1984. ISBN 3-900508-04-6. In German and English.
- Haien: Tōmatsu Shōmei sakuhinshū (廃園：東松照明作品集, Ruinous Gardens). Tokyo: Parco, 1987. ISBN 4-89194-150-2. Edited by Toshiharu Ito.
- Sakura sakura sakura 66 (さくら・桜・サクラ66). Osaka: Brain Center, 1990. ISBN 4-8339-0513-2. Color photographs of sakura.
- Sakura sakura sakura 120 (さくら・桜・サクラ120) / Sakura. Osaka: Brain Center, 1990. ISBN 4-8339-0512-4. Color photographs of sakura. Texts in both Japanese and English.
- Nagasaki "11:02" 1945-nen 8-gatsu 9-nichi (長崎〈11:02〉1945年8月9日). Photo Musée. Tokyo: Shinchōsha, 1995. ISBN 4-10-602411-X.
- Visions of Japan. Kyoto: Kōrinsha, 1997. ISBN 4-7713-2831-5. Photographs taken 1987–9 of plastic goods washed up by the sea.
- Tomatsu Shomei. Visions of Japan. Kyoto: Kōrinsha, 1998. ISBN 4-7713-2806-4.
- Toki no shimajima (時の島々). Tokyo: Iwanami, 1998. ISBN 4-00-008072-5. Text by Ryūta Imafuku (今福竜太).
- Nihon no Shashinka 30: Tōmatsu Shōmei (日本の写真家30：東松照明 ). Tokyo: Iwanami, 1999. ISBN 4-00-008370-8. A compact overview of Tōmatsu's career, within a series about the Japanese photographic pantheon.
- Tōmatsu Shōmei 1951–60 (東松照明1951-60, Shōmei Tōmatsu 1951–60). Tokyo: Sakuhinsha, 2000. ISBN 4-87893-350-X.
- Jeffrey, Ian. Shomei Tomatsu. Phaidon 55. London: Phaidon, 2001. ISBN 0-7148-4019-X.
- Nantō (南島) / Nan-to. Gallery Nii, 2007. Color photographs of Taiwan, Guam, Saipan, and other islands in the southern Pacific.
- camp OKINAWA. Tokyo: Mirai-sha, 2010. The 9th book in the Okinawa Photograph Series (沖縄写真家シリーズ[琉球烈像] 第9巻).
- Shomei Tomatsu Photographs 1951-2000. Berlin: Only Photography, 2012. Text in Japanese and English.
- Make. Super Labo, 2013. Text in Japanese and English.
- Chewing Gum and Chocolate. New York: Aperture, 2013.
- Shinhen taiyō no empitsu (新編 太陽の鉛筆, Pencil of the Sun: New Edition). Kyoto: AKAAKA, 2015.
- Mr. Freedom. Tokyo: Akio Nagasawa Publishing, 2020. Text in Japanese and English.

=== Exhibition catalogues ===
- Interface: Shomei Tomatu Tokyo: Tokyo Metropolitan Museum of Modern Art, 1996. Text in Japanese and English.
- Nihon rettō kuronikuru: Tōmatsu no 50-nen (日本列島クロンクル：東末の50年) / Traces: 50 years of Tomatsu's works. Tokyo: Tokyo Metropolitan Museum of Photography, 1999. Text in Japanese and English.
- Rubinfien, Leo, et al. Shomei Tomatsu: Skin of the Nation. Yale University Press, 2004. ISBN 0-300-10604-1. Exhibition first held at SFMOMA.
- Camp karafuru na! Amarinimo karafuru na!! (Campカラフルな!あまりにもカラフルな!!). Gallery Nii, 2005. Colorful photographs around US military bases in Okinawa.
- Nagasaki mandara: Tōmatsu Shōmei no me 1961– (長崎曼荼羅：東松照明の眼1961〜). Nagasaki: Nagasaki Shinbunsha, 2005. ISBN 4-931493-68-8.
- Aichi mandara: Tōmatsu Shōmei no gen-fūkei (愛知曼陀羅：東松照明の原風景) / Aichi Mandala: The Early works of Shomei Tomatsu. Aichi Prefectural Museum of Art and Chunichi Shimbun, 2006. Exhibition held June–July 2006. Photographs 1950–59, and also a small number of later works, of Aichi. This large book has captions in Japanese and English, some other texts in both languages, and some material in Japanese only.
- Tōkyō mandara (Tokyo曼陀羅) / Tokyo Mandala: The World of Shomei Tomatsu. Tokyo: Tokyo Metropolitan Museum of Photography, 1997. Exhibition held October–December 2007.
- Tomatsu Shomei Photographs (写真家・東松照明 全仕事). Nagoya: Nagoya Art Museum, 2011.
- Tōmatsu Shōmei to okinawa taiyō no raburetā (東松照明と沖縄 太陽へのラブレター, Tomatsu Shomei and Okinawa. Love Letter to the Sun). Okinawa: Okinawa Prefectural Museum, 2011.
- Tomatsu Shomei Photographs. Toyama: Tonami Art Museum 2012.

=== Other contributions ===
- Hiraki, Osamu, and Keiichi Takeuchi. Japan, a Self-Portrait: Photographs 1945–1964. Paris: Flammarion, 2004. ISBN 2-08-030463-1. Tōmatsu is one of eleven photographers whose works appear in this large book (the others are Ken Domon, Hiroshi Hamaya, Tadahiko Hayashi, Eikoh Hosoe, Yasuhiro Ishimoto, Kikuji Kawada, Ihei Kimura, Shigeichi Nagano, Ikkō Narahara, Takeyoshi Tanuma).
- Holborn, Mark. Black Sun: The Eyes of Four: Roots and Innovation in Japanese Photography. New York: Aperture, 1986. ISBN 0-89381-185-8. The other three are Masahisa Fukase, Eikoh Hosoe, and Daidō Moriyama.
- 25-nin no 20-dai no shashin (25人の20代の写真) / Works by 25 Photographers in their 20s. Kiyosato Museum of Photographic Arts exhibition catalogue, 1995. Parallel texts in Japanese and English.
- Kaku: Hangenki (核：半減期) / The Half Life of Awareness: Photographs of Hiroshima and Nagasaki. Tokyo: Tokyo Metropolitan Museum of Photography, 1995. Exhibition catalogue; captions and text in both Japanese and English. Twenty-three pages are devoted to photographs by Tōmatsu (other works are by Ken Domon, Toshio Fukada, Kikujirō Fukushima, Shigeo Hayashi, Kenji Ishiguro, Shunkichi Kikuchi, Mitsugi Kishida, Eiichi Matsumoto, Yoshito Matsushige, Hiromi Tsuchida and Yōsuke Yamahata).
- Nihon shashin no tenkan: 1960 nendai no hyōgen (日本写真の転換：1960時代の表現) / Innovation in Japanese Photography in the 1960s. Tokyo: Tokyo Metropolitan Museum of Photography, 1991. Exhibition catalogue, text in Japanese and English. Pp. 78–88 show photographs from the series "11:02 Nagasaki".
- Szarkowski, John, and Shoji Yamagishi. New Japanese Photography. New York: Museum of Modern Art, 1974. ISBN 0-87070-503-2 (hard), ISBN 0-87070-503-2 (paper). Contains twenty photographs by Tōmatsu.
- Yamagishi, Shoji, ed. Japan: A Self-Portrait. New York: International Center of Photography, 1979. ISBN 0-933642-01-6 (hard), ISBN 0-933642-02-4 (paper). Contains twelve photographs by Tōmatsu of "American bases and their surroundings: 1960s–1970s".

== See also ==
- Photography in Nagoya
- Photography in Japan

== Sources and further reading ==
=== General references ===
- Holborn, Mark. Black Sun: The Eyes of Four: Roots and Innovation in Japanese Photography. New York: Aperture, 1986. ISBN 0-89381-185-8
- Hoaglund, Linda. "Interview with Tomatsu Shomei." positions, vol. 5, 1997. https://doi.org/10.1215/10679847-5-3-834
- Rubinfien, Leo, et al. Shomei Tomatsu: Skin of the Nation. Yale University Press, 2004. ISBN 0-300-10604-1.
- Tucker, Anne Wilkes, et al. The History of Japanese Photography. New Haven: Yale University Press, 2003. ISBN 0-300-09925-8
- "Skin of the Nation": interactive feature for the exhibition at SFMOMA.
