= Vivo (photography) =

Japanese photography cooperative

- VIVO
- Founded: July 1957
- Dissolved: June 1961
- Type: Photographic cooperative
- Purpose: Creative post‑war documentary and expressive photography
- Headquarters: Higashi Ginza, Tokyo, Japan
- Region served: Japan
- Members: Six founding members
- Key people: Eikoh Hosoe; Kikuji Kawada; Ikkō Narahara; Akira Satō; Akira Tanno; Shōmei Tōmatsu

Vivo was a short-lived Japanese photographic cooperative.

Eikoh Hosoe, Kikuji Kawada, Ikkō Narahara, Akira Satō, Akira Tanno, and Shōmei Tōmatsu — six of the participants of the celebrated 1957 exhibition Jūnin no me (10人の眼, Eyes of ten) — formed the Vivo cooperative in July 1957, naming it after the Esperanto word for "life."

Vivo emerged from a postwar photographic milieu shaped in part by the Japan Subjective Photography League, founded in 1956, through which younger photographers such as Ikkō Narahara, Kiyoji Ōtsuji, and Yasuhiro Ishimoto were briefly brought into the same field of reference as prewar avant-garde figures including Kansuke Yamamoto.

They shared an office and darkroom in Higashi Ginza (Tokyo), marketing and distributing their own work. Kōtarō Iizawa terms their office "the epicenter of the 'image generation's' photographic expression," and the members' activities "a prime example" of the way Japanese photographers of the time "confronted head-on the transformation of modern Japanese society."

Their work moved from the photjournalism's style to capturing reality beyond language. Their work as a result was often "are-bure-boke", meaning "blurry and out-of-focus".

The group disbanded in June 1961.

Retrospectives have included a major exhibition at the Shadai Gallery.
