= Kikuji Kawada =

Japanese photographer

Kikuji Kawada (川田 喜久治, Kawada Kikuji; born 1933) is a Japanese photographer. He co-founded the Vivo photographic collective in 1959. Kawada's books include Chizu (The Map; 1965) and The Last Cosmology (1995). He was included in the New Japanese Photography exhibition at the Museum of Modern Art, New York in 1974 and was awarded the Lifetime Achievement Award from the Photographic Society of Japan in 2011.

== Life and work ==
Kawada co-founded the Vivo photographic collective in 1959 with Akira Sato, Eikoh Hosoe, Ikko Narahara, Akira Tanno and Shomei Tomatsu. Sean O'Hagan wrote that "broke the traditions of photojournalism and landscape photography, leading it towards a more experimental, often polemical form."

Kawada's book Chizu (The Map) has been praised by critics. Brett Rogers, director of The Photographers' Gallery, London, has said it is a "deeply moving and highly original investigation into a seminal moment in Japanese history." In The Photobook: A History, Vol. 1, Martin Parr and Gerry Badger describe Chizu as being amongst four books that "constitute photography's most significant memorials to the defining event in twentieth-century Japanese history" and that it is "the ultimate photobook-as-object, combining a typical Japanese attention to the art of refined packaging with hard-hitting photography, text and typography – a true photo-text piece. No photobook has been more successful in combining graphic design with complex photographic narrative." O'Hagan wrote in The Guardian that it is "perhaps the most intricately designed and powerfully evocative Japanese photobook ever [ . . . ] By turns impressionistic and surreal, the book demands a degree of patient, silent contemplation that echoes the act of remembering."

O'Hagan wrote of The Last Cosmology (1995) that "the strange skies full of lunar portents, forks of lightning, fleeting meteorites and blocked out suns are a kind of mirror of Kawada's brooding, troubled soul. He spent his youth in the long shadow of Hiroshima and Nagasaki, and made the images in The Last Cosmology between 1980 and 2000 – a time of global uncertainty." He added that the images also evoke "a sense of impending catastrophe."

== Publications ==
- Chizu (地図) = The Map.
  - Tokyo: Bijutsu Shuppan-sha, 1965. Text by Kenzaburō Ōe.
  - Tōkyō-to Chōfu-shi: Getsuyōsha, 2005. ISBN 9784901477161. Text in Japanese and English.
  - Tucson, AZ: Nazraeli, 2005. ISBN 9781590051238. Text in Japanese and English. Edition of 500 copies.
  - Chizu (Reprint Edition). Tokyo: Akio Nagasawa, 2014. OCLC 951442394. With texts in English by Ōe, "Map," and Kawada, "On the re-reprint of "Chizu" (1965)". Edition of 600 copies.
- ''ラスト・コスモロジー = The Last Cosmology.
  - ラスト・コスモロジー : 川田喜久治写真集 = The Last Cosmology : Photographs. Tōkyō: 491, 1995. OCLC 213343192.
  - The Last Cosmology. London: Mack, 2015. ISBN 9781910164235.
- Cosmos of the Dream King. Tokyo: Asahi Sonorama, 1995.
- Kikuji Kawada. Tōkyō: Iwanami Shoten, 1998. ISBN 9784000083737. Text in Japanese.
- Japan, 1951–1960. Nazraeli Press Six by Six, set 5 v. 3. Portland, OR: Nazraeli, 2014. ISBN 9781590054024. Edition of 100 copies.
- Remote Past A Memoir 1951–1966. Tokyo: Case, 2016. With an afterword by Rei Matsuda, in Japanese and English. Edition of 1000 copies.
- Chizu (Maquette Edition). London: Mack, 2021. ISBN 978-1-912339-71-6.

== Awards ==
- Lifetime Achievement Award, Photographic Society of Japan awards

== Exhibitions ==
=== Solo exhibitions ===
- Kikuji Kawada - The Last Cosmology, Michael Hoppen Gallery, London, 2014/15.
- Kukuji Kawada: Last Cosmology, L. Parker Stephenson Photographs, New York, 2014/15.
- Kikuji Kawada: Los Caprichos-Instagraphy-2017, P.G.I Gallery, Tokyo, 2018.
- Kikuji Kawada: Then & Now, L. Parker Stephenson Photographs, New York, 2016.
- Kikuji Kawada: 100 Illusions, Cannon Gallery S, Tokyo, 2018.
- Kawada Kikuji: Chizu (The Map), Museum of Fine Arts, Boston, 2026

=== Group exhibitions ===
- 1957: Jūnin no me (10人の眼, Eyes of ten), Konishiroku Photo Gallery, Tokyo, 1957. Organised by Tatsuo Fukushima.
- 1974: New Japanese Photography, Museum of Modern Art, New York, 1974. Directed by John Szarkowski and Shoji Yamagishi. Included the work of fifteen artists.
- 2014: Chizu = The Map book, and The Map 1959–1965 installation of 90 photographs, were included in Conflict, Time, Photography, Tate Modern, London, 2014/15; Museum Folkwang, Essen, 2015; Staatliche Kunstsammlungen Dresden, Dresden, Germany, 2015.
