= Hitoshi Tsukiji =

Japanese photographer (born 1947)

Hitoshi Tsukiji (築地 仁, Tsukiji Hitoshi; born 1947) is a Japanese photographer.
