= Shigeichi Nagano =

Japanese photographer (1925–2019)

Shigeichi Nagano (長野 重一, Nagano Shigeichi; March 30, 1925 – January 30, 2019) was a Japanese photographer. He won the Ina Nobuo Award in 1986 and had a major retrospective at the Tokyo Metropolitan Museum of Photography in 2000.

== Life and work ==
Nagano was born in Ōita City in Ōita Prefecture, and studied economics at Keio University (Tokyo). On graduating, he joined a trading company, but soon resigned. He was recruited by Natori Yōnosuke for Weekly Sun News (週刊サンニュース, Shūkan San Nyūsu); and in 1949 moved to Iwanami Shoten where, again under Natori, he did the photography for about fifty of the slim volumes in Iwanami Shashin Bunko. In 1954 he went freelance, concentrating on magazine work.

During the 1960s Nagano observed the period of intense economic growth in Japan, depicting the lives of Tokyo's sarariman with some humor. The photographs of this period were only published in book form much later, as Dorīmu eiji and 1960 (1978 and 1990 respectively).

In 1964 Nagano worked on the cinemaphotography for Ichikawa Kon's film Tokyo Olympiad, and he then moved to work in film and television, particularly television commercials.

Nagano exhibited recent examples of his street photography in 1986, winning the Ina Nobuo Award. He published several books of his works since then, and won a number of awards. Nagano had a major retrospective at the Tokyo Metropolitan Museum of Photography in 2000.

Nagano died two months short of his 94th birthday, on January 30, 2019.

== Books of Nagano's works ==
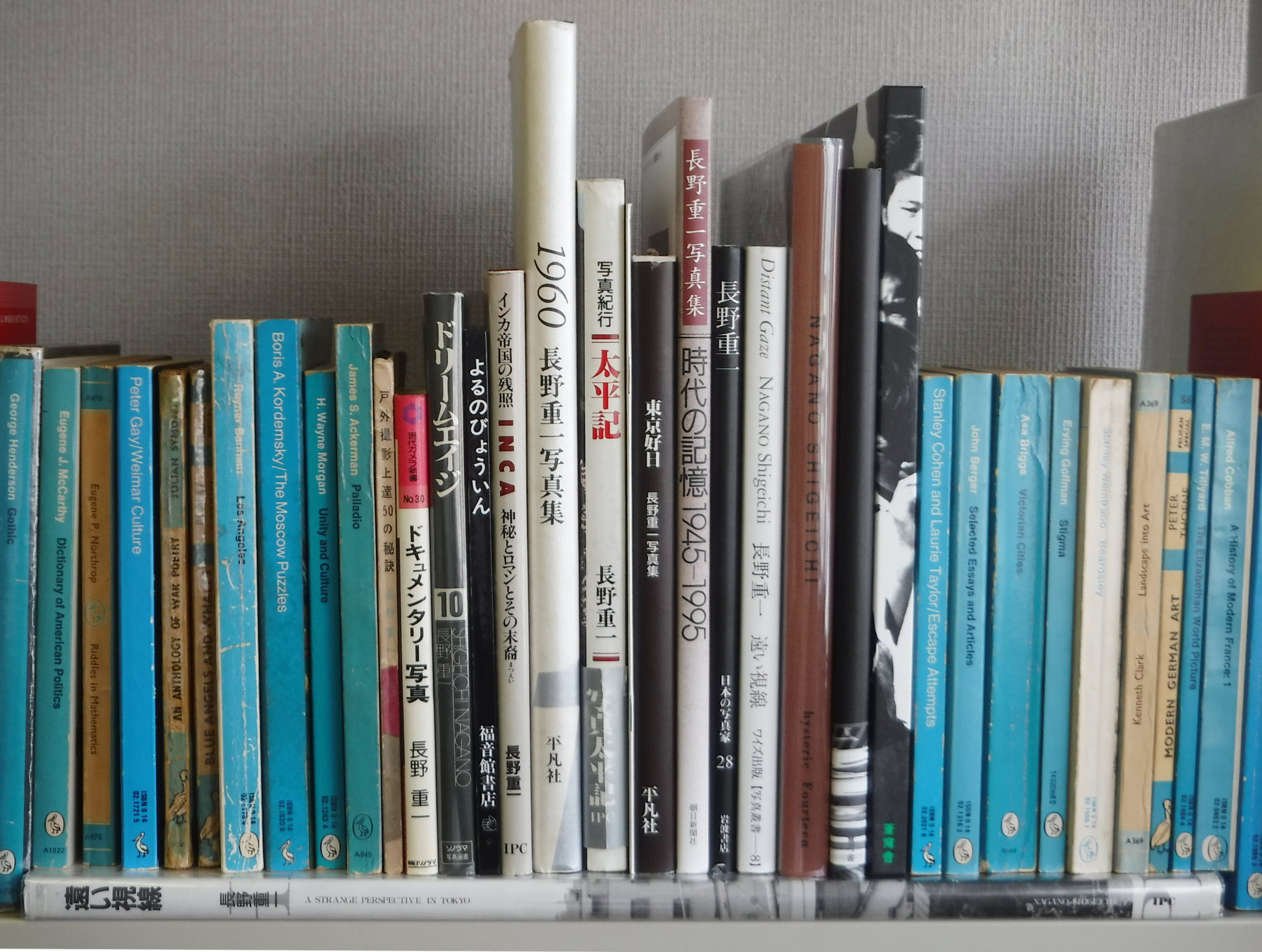
Books by Nagano, left to right: Kogai satsuei jōtatsu 50 no hiketsu; Dokyumentarī shashin; Japan's Dream Age; The Hospital at Night (later edition); Inka teikoku no zanshō; 1960; Taiheiki; Nagano Shigeichi sakuhinten: 1960 Berurin Nihon; Tōkyō kōjitsu; Jidai no kioku 1945–1995; Nagano Shigeichi (Nihon no shashinka); Distant Gaze; Nagano Shigeichi (Hysteric 14); Distant Gaze: Dark Blossom of Winter; Hongkong Reminiscence 1958; surrounded by irrelevant Pelicans, and lying on top of the unusually large-format A Strange Perspective in Tokyo

- Iwanami Shashin Bunko (岩波写真文庫). Tokyo: Iwanami. (in Japanese) Nagano is reputed to have done the photography for 50 or 60 of this large set. They include:
  - Kamakura (鎌倉). 1950. Reprint: Tokyo: Iwanami, 1988. ISBN 4-00-003549-5. The reprint names Nagano as photographer.
  - Nagasaki (長崎). 1951.
  - Hiroshima (広島). 1952.
- Kogai satsuei jōtatsu 50 no hiketsu (戸外撮影上達50の秘訣). Tokyo: Genkōsha, 1954. (in Japanese)
- Dokyumentarī shashin (ドキュメンタリー写真). Gendai Kamera Shinsho 30. Tokyo: Asahi Sonorama, 1977. (in Japanese)
- Dorīmu eiji (ドリ-ムエイジ) / Japan's Dream Age. Sonorama Shashin Sensho 10. Tokyo: Asahi Sonorama, 1978. (in Japanese and English) A new edition of Nagano's photographs of urban Japan in the period of high growth.
- Yoru no byōin (よるのびょういん) / The Hospital at Night. Kodomo-no-tomo. Tokyo: Fukuinkan, 1979. (in Japanese) Nagano provides the photographs for this slim children's book, whose text (all in hiragana) is by Tanikawa Shuntarō.
  - Tokyo: Fukuinkan, 1985. ISBN 4-8340-0134-2.
- Inka teikoku no zanshō: Shinbi to roman to sono matsuei (インカ帝国の残照：神秘とロマンとその末裔). Tokyo: IBC, 1988. ISBN 4-87198-787-6. (in Japanese)
- Tōi shisen: 1980–1989 Tokyo (遠い視線：1980–1989 Tokyo) / A Strange Perspective in Tokyo. Tokyo: IBC, 1989. ISBN 4-87198-800-7. (in Japanese)
- 1960: Nagano Shigeichi shashinshū (1960：長野重一写真集). Tokyo: Heibonsha, 1990. ISBN 4-582-27722-5. (in Japanese) Nagano's black and white photographs taken in 1960 of Berlin and Japan.
- Taiheiki: Shashin kikō (太平記 写真紀行). Tokyo: IBC, 1991. (in Japanese) ISBN 4-87198-834-1.
- Nagano Shigeichi sakuhinten: 1960 Berurin Nihon (長野重一作品展: 1960ベルリン・日本). JCII Photo Salon Library 7. Tokyo: JCII Photo Salon, 1991. (in Japanese) Exhibition catalogue.
- Tōkyō kōjitsu (東京好日). Tokyo: Heibonsha, 1995. ISBN 4-582-27732-2. (in Japanese) Captions give the location in Japanese script and the year; also with an essay in Japanese.
- Jidai no kioku 1945–1995: Nagano Shigeichi shashinshū (時代の記憶1945–1995: 長野重一写真集). Tokyo: Asahi Shinbunsha, 1995. ISBN 4-02-258611-7. (in Japanese)
- Nagano Shigeichi (長野重一). Nihon no Shashinka. Tokyo: Iwanami, 1999. ISBN 4-00-008368-6. (in Japanese) A survey of Nagano's work.
- Kono kuni no kioku: Nagano Shigeichi, shashin no shigoto (この国の記憶：長野重一・写真の仕事) / A Chronicle of Japan: Nagano Shigeichi: A Life in Photography. Tokyo: Nihon Shashin Kikaku, 2000. ISBN 4-930887-28-3. (in Japanese) Catalogue of an exhibition held at the Tokyo Metropolitan Museum of Photography, 2000. Captions are in English as well as Japanese; other text is in Japanese only.
- Tōi shisen (遠い視線) / Distant Gaze. Tokyo: Wides, 2001. ISBN 4-89830-091-X. (in Japanese)
- Nagano Shigeichi (長野重一). Hysteric 14. Tokyo: Hysteric Glamour, 2005. (in Japanese and English) Photographs 1949–59, 2001–2004. Captions in Japanese and English.
- (in Japanese) Tōkyō 1950 nendai (東京1950年代, Tokyo in the 1950s). Tokyo: Iwanami, 2007. ISBN 978-4-00-024162-5. (in Japanese) Photographs of the streets of Tokyo. With an essay by Saburō Kawamoto.
- Tōi shisen: Gentō (遠い視線 玄冬) / Distant Gaze: Dark Blossom of Winter. Tokyo: Sokyu-sha, 2008. (in Japanese)
- Honkon tsuioku (香港追憶) / Hongkong Reminiscence 1958. Tokyo: Sokyu-sha, 2009. (in Japanese and English) Photographs of Hong Kong taken in 1958. Short texts in Japanese and English, captions in Japanese only.
- Magajin wāku 60 nendai (マガジン・ワーク60年代) / Magazine Work 60s. Tokyo: Life Goes On & Taxi (distrib. Heibonsha), 2009. ISBN 978-4-582-27775-3. (in Japanese and English) Works published (or intended for publication) in magazines, 1958–1971. Text in Japanese and English.

== Works with contributions by Nagano ==
- Densha ni miru toshi fūkei 1981–2006 (電車にみる都市風景 1981–2006 / Scenes of Tokyo City: Prospects from the Train 1981–2006. Tama City, Tokyo: Tama City Cultural Foundation Parthenon Tama, 2006. Exhibition catalogue. Captions and text in Japanese and English.
- Feustel, Marc. Japanese Postwar Photography, Hamaya Hiroshi, Nagano Shigeichi and Tanuma Takeyoshi. Paris: Studio Equis, 2005.
- Feustel, Marc. Eyes of an Island, Japanese Photography 1945–2007. Paris: Studio Equis, 2007.
- Hiraki, Osamu, and Keiichi Takeuchi. Japon, un autoportrait: Photographies 1945–1964. Paris: Flammarion, 2004. ISBN 2-08-011330-5.
  - Japan, a Self-Portrait: Photographs 1945–1964. Paris: Flammarion, 2004. ISBN 2-08-030463-1.
  - Nihon no "jigazō", 1945–1964 (日本の「自画像」, 1945–1964). Tokyo: Iwanami Shoten, 2004. ISBN 4-00-008215-9.
  - Nihon no jigazō: Shashin ga egaku sengo, 1945–1964 (日本の自画像 写真が描く戦後, 1945–1964). Tokyo: Kurevisu, 2009.
- Iwanami Shoten Henshūbu (岩波書店編集部). Tachiagaru Hiroshima 1952 (立ち上がるヒロシマ1952). Tokyo: Iwanami Shoten, 2013. ISBN 9784000259101. Nagano is credited as one of the small number of photographers.
- Nihon shashin no tenkan: 1960 nendai no hyōgen (日本写真の転換：1960時代の表現) / Innovation in Japanese Photography in the 1960s. Tokyo: Tokyo Metropolitan Museum of Photography, 1991. Exhibition catalogue, text in Japanese and English. Pp.90–97 show photographs from the series "Dream Age".
- Shashin toshi Tōkyō (写真都市Tokyo) / Tokyo/City of Photos. Tokyo: Tokyo Metropolitan Museum of Photography, 1995. Catalogue of an exhibition held in 1995. Captions and texts in both Japanese and English.
- Tōkyō: Toshi no shisen (東京：都市の視線) / Tokyo: A city perspective. Tokyo: Tokyo Metropolitan Museum of Photography, 1990. Captions and text in Japanese and English.
