= Akira Satō (photographer) =

Japanese photographer (1930–2002)

Akira Satō (佐藤 明, Satō Akira; 1930–2002) was a Japanese photographer noted for his photographs of girls and of Europe.

Satō was born on 30 July 1930 in Tokyo. While a student of economics at Yokohama National University he was an avid reader of Life and other photographic and fashion magazines at the American CIE library in Hibiya. He graduated in 1953 and one year later became a freelance photographer, specializing in fashion. From around 1956 he was caught up with new trends in photography, and he participated in the 1957 exhibition Jūnin no me (10人の眼, Eyes of ten), subsequently joining the collective "Vivo".

Satō had a series of one-man shows starting in 1961, alongside publications within the camera magazines. He specialized in black-and-white photographs of girls: their faces in close-up, their bodies surrounded by nature.

In 1963 Satō went to the US and then Europe; he returned to Japan in 1965. Thereafter he made many trips to Europe, particularly Scandinavia and Vienna, primarily photographing in color.

Satō died on 2 April 2002.

== Books of Satō's photographs ==
- Onna (女). Tokyo: Chūōkoronsha, 1971.
- Hokuō sanpo (北欧散歩). Alpha Art, 1977.
- Wīn gensō (ウィーン幻想) / Wien. Tokyo: Heibonsha, 1989. ISBN 4-582-27720-9.
- Sai: Satō Akira Toshima-ku o toru (彩：佐藤明豊島区を撮る). Tokyo: Toshima-ku, 1991. A booklet.
- Barokku anatomia (バロック・アナトミア) / Anatomia Barocca. Tokyo: Treville, 1994. ISBN 4-8457-0947-3.
- Firentse (フィレンツェ) / Firenze. Tokyo: Kōdansha, 1997. ISBN 4-06-208969-6.
- Onna, soshite, byakuya (おんな・そして・白夜) / Eves and White Nights. Tokyo: Nikkor Club, 1998. Black-and-white photographs of girls, color photographs of Scandinavia.
- (in Japanese) Puraha (プラハ) / Praha. Tokyo: Shinchōsha, 2003. ISBN 4-10-459201-3. A posthumous collection of black-and-white photographs.

== Other books with works by Satō ==
- Nihon shashin no tenkan: 1960 nendai no hyōgen (日本写真の転換：1960時代の表現) / Innovation in Japanese Photography in the 1960s. Tokyo: Tokyo Metropolitan Museum of Photography, 1991. Exhibition catalogue, text in Japanese and English. PP.62–67 are devoted to Satō's photographs of girls.

== Sources ==
- Nihon shashinka jiten (日本写真家事典) / 328 Outstanding Japanese Photographers. Kyoto: Tankōsha, 2000. ISBN 4-473-01750-8.
