= Akira Tanno =

Japanese photographer

Akira Tanno (丹野 章, Tanno Akira; 8 August 1925 – 5 August 2015) was a Japanese photographer who was a member of Vivo.
