= Eikoh Hosoe =

Japanese photographer (1933–2024)

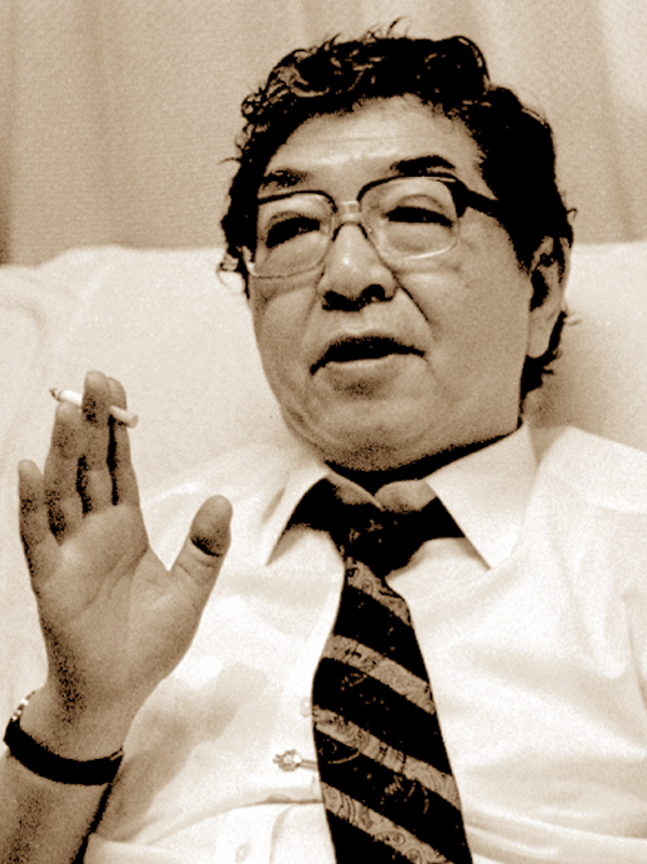
- Hosoe in 1989
- Born: 18 March 1933; Yonezawa, Yamagata, Japan
- Died: 16 September 2024 (aged 91); Tokyo, Japan
- Occupation: Photographer

Eikoh Hosoe (細江 英公, Hosoe Eikō; 18 March 1933 – 16 September 2024) was a Japanese photographer and filmmaker who emerged in the experimental arts movement of post-World War II Japan. Hosoe is best known for his dark, high contrast, black and white photographs of human bodies. His images are often psychologically charged, exploring subjects such as death, erotic obsession, and irrationality. Some of his photographs reference religion, philosophy and mythology, while others are nearly abstract, such as Man and Woman # 24, from 1960. He was professionally and personally affiliated with the writer Yukio Mishima and experimental artists of the 1960s such as the dancer Tatsumi Hijikata, though his work extends to a diversity of subjects. His photography is not only notable for its artistic influence but for its wider contribution to the reputations of his subjects.

== Biography ==
Hosoe was born on 18 March 1933 in Yonezawa, Yamagata, one of three sons of Yonejiro and Mitsu Hosoe. At birth Hosoe's name was "Toshihiro" (敏廣); he adopted the name "Eikoh" after World War II to symbolize a new Japan. He witnessed the firebombing of Tokyo in 1944 and his family was subsequently evacuated to his mother's village. He returned to Tokyo where he was primarily raised. He is the older brother of the designer Isao Hosoe.

In high school he was a member of the photography club and the English-Language club. In 1950 he took a photograph of a little girl living on the military base he visited every week to take English classes. This image, Poddie Jawoski won him top prize of the student section in the 1951 Fuji Photo Contest. After this, he decided to pursue photography as a career. After high-school he attended to Tokyo College of Photography. While he was a student there in the early 1950s Hosoe joined "Demokrato," an avant-garde artists' group led by the artist Ei-Q. In the late 1950s, after graduating from Tokyo College of Photography, Hosoe worked as a freelance photographer for photography magazines and women's magazines. At this time he also began associating with other young, progressive photographers such as Kikuji Kawada, Shomei Tomatsu, and Ikko Narahara. Hosoe cofounded the "Vivo" collective in 1959, which takes its name from the Esperanto word for "life."

In 1960, Hosoe created the Jazz Film Laboratory (Jazzu Eiga Jikken-shitsu) with Shuji Terayama, Shintaro Ishihara, and others. The Jazz Film Laboratory was a multidisciplinary artistic project aimed at producing highly expressive and intense works such as Hosoe's 1960 short black and white film Navel and A-Bomb (Heso to genbaku). Art historian and curator Alexandra Munroe describes that the group was "Anti-tradition, anti-authority, and opposed Social Realism" and "deliberately rejected common sense" and "the conventions of a rigid society." Other notable artistic affiliations of the time include Daido Moriyama, who worked as Hosoe's assistant in 1961.

In the sixties Hosoe traveled abroad yearly, seeing the art of the Fluxus group in New York and of Antonio Gaudi in Barcelona. Gaudi's architecture would become an important subject for Hosoe's photographs.

Hosoe died in Tokyo on 16 September 2024, at the age of 91 from an adrenal gland tumor.

== Relationship with Hijikata ==
Man and Woman #24 by Eikoh Hosoe, Honolulu Museum of Art

Hosoe first met Tatsumi Hijikata in 1958 when the latter's company performed an interpretation of Yukio Mishima's novel Kinjiki (Forbidden Colors), about secret homosexual desire. The interpretation featured two dancers interacting with a chicken, a performance that Hosoe described as "ferocious." According to curator and academic Yasufumi Nakamori, the encounter fundamentally changed Hosoe's relationship to his photographic subjects in which Hosoe "began to view himself as involved in the creation of a distinct space and time."

Hosoe began working with Hijikata, first on a brochure of photographs that would be featured in Hosoe's first major collection, Man and Woman in 1961. The two subsequently traveled together to Hijikata's home prefecture of Akita on multiple occasions during which their collaboration Kamaitachi (1969) came to fruition. Hosoe shot Kamaitachi with Hijikata as a model, a series of images that reference stories of a supernatural being—a "sickle-toothed weasel"—that haunted the Japanese countryside of Hosoe's childhood. Munroe describes the kamaitachi as "a small invisible animal that was believed to attack people in the rice paddies at night. When it struck, a person would find his limbs and flesh sliced as if by a flying blade, but strangely, the wounds were bloodless." In the photographs, Hijikata is seen wandering ghost-like within the stark landscape, confronting farmers and children. Initially playing the role of the Fool, by the end of the series Hijikata is seen ominously carrying off a young boy.

In 1968 Tadanori Yokoo designed the poster for Kamaitachi, which was both an exhibition and published in book form. Kamaitachi was also included a danced component choreographed and performed by Hijikata at Nikon Salon in Tokyo for the photographic exhibition's opening.

== Relationship with Mishima ==
Man and Woman, Hosoe and Hijikata's first photographic collaboration, was seen by Hijikata's friend Yukio Mishima, who asked Hosoe for photographs to feature in his collection of essays. The subsequent result was "The Assault of Beauty." After this, Hosoe asked Mishima to model for him. It is reported that Mishima said to Hosoe, "I will give myself up to you as the subject matter for your camera. I want you to feel free to use me as you see fit and take whatever images your vision suggests." This led to their well-known Killed by Roses or Ordeal by Roses (Bara-kei, 薔薇刑, 1961–1962). In these photographs, Hosoe created a series of dark, erotic images centered on the male body with Mishima dramatically posing. The series was primarily taken at the writer's home in the Magome district of Tokyo between autumn 1961 and spring 1962. The photographs employ props such as a garden hose and a mallet to seemingly symbolic, yet ambiguous, effect. Mishima was pleased with the photographs, in part because of how they resisted straightforward or singular interpretations.

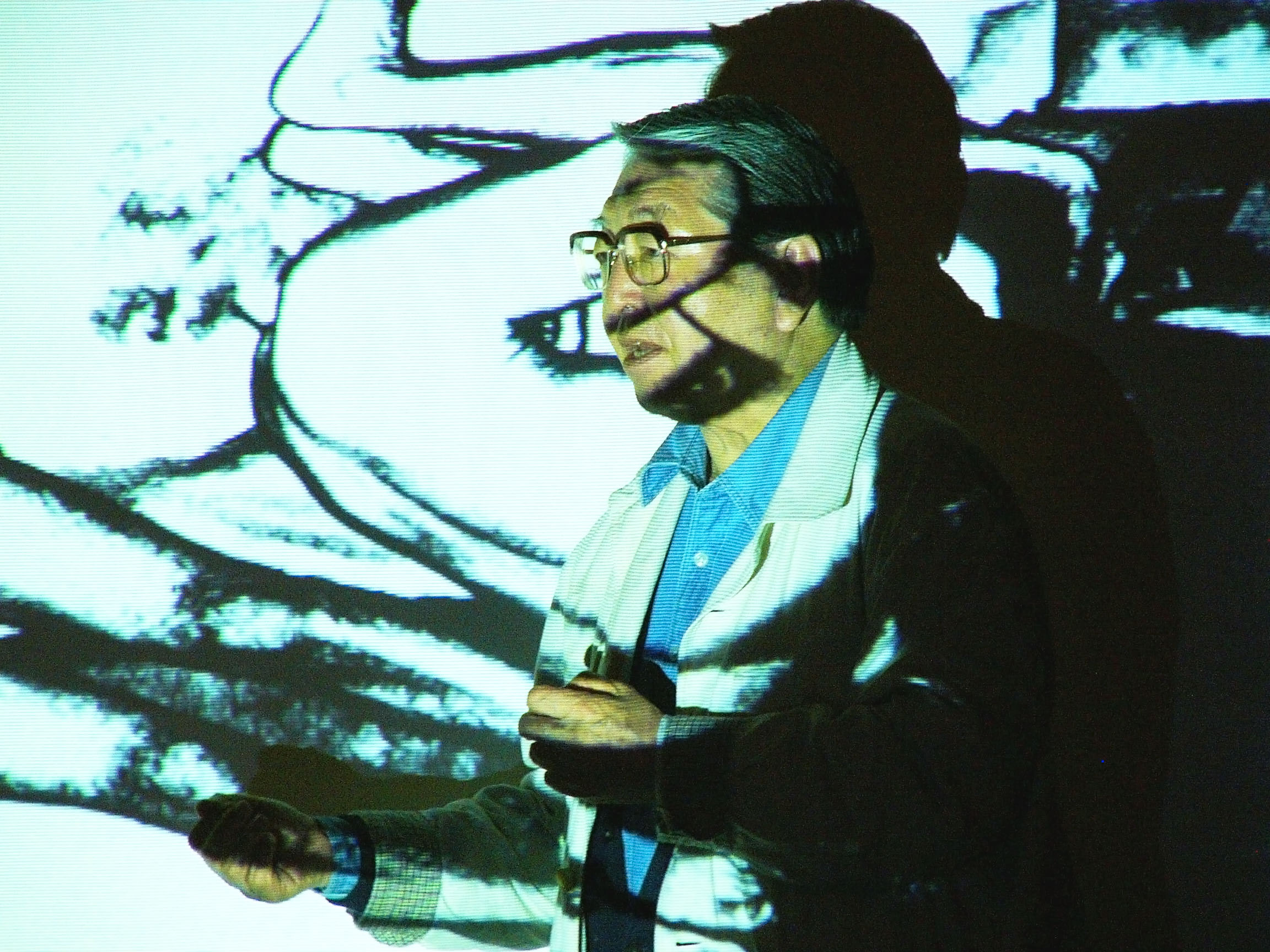
Hosoe in 2005

Pleased with the outcome, the two decided to shoot together again. This time, Mishima told his wife to leave with their children beforehand, claiming the shoot may have negative effects on their morals. Occasionally featuring other people like Hijikata or the actress Kyoko Enami, these subsequent photos sometime evoke aspects of Mishima's favorite paintings by Botticelli and Giorgione. In the preface to the published edition, Mishima recounts, "The world to which I was abducted under the spell of his lens was abnormal, warped, sarcastic, grotesque, savage, and promiscuous . . . yet there was a clear undercurrent of lyricism murmuring gently through its unseen conduits." During this time, Daido Moriyama was Hosoe's assistant. He has recalled the complex and difficult darkroom technique he had to employ in order to produce the images that Hosoe had imagined. The compositing of negatives produces a dream-like or mythological effect, heightened by the stark contrast and suggestive imagery.

One of these photographs appeared on the cover of Mishima's "Assault of Beauty" (Bi no shūgeki) in 1961, a Kōdansha-published collection of essays. The following year, the photographs were exhibited at "Non," an exhibition organized by Tatsuo Fukushima at the Matsuda Department Store in Tokyo. The images were then published as Barakei in March 1963 in a large-format book designed by Kōhei Sugiura. The book was organized into five chapters: Preface, Daily Civilian Life, The Scornful Clock, or the Slothful Witness, Various Blasphemies, and Ordeal by Roses. According to Hosoe, Mishima had suggested a handful of titles from which Barakei was chosen, including "Death and Loquaciousness," "Passion Variations," "Sketches of Martyrdom." Mishima would later say that Hosoe's photographs enabled him to live in "grotesque, barbaric and dissipated" inner world, shot with "a pure undercurrent of lyricism". The work earned Hosoe considerable notoriety in Japan.

In 1970 Hosoe had decided to republish the collection of photographs shot with Mishima as a new, international edition. This new edition was to be designed by Tadanori Yokoo. Scheduled for November, the release was postponed when Yokoo was involved in a car accident. Shortly after, on 25 November, the "Mishima Incident" occurred, ending with Mishima's ritual suicide by seppuku in 1970. Hosoe has noted that he did notice some unusual things at this time, such as the early completion and delivery of Mishima's preface for Hosoe's forthcoming collection Hōyō (Embrace), although Mishima's suicide came as a complete surprised to his friend Hosoe.

Hosoe halted work on the second edition of Killed by Roses, unsure of how it would be received in the immediate aftermath of Mishima's spectacular suicide. A significant reason was that he did not want to appear to be taking advantage of Mishima's death for his personal gain. However, Mishima widow, Yōko Mishima, persuaded him to go ahead with the planned release, noting that her late husband had been eagerly anticipating its release. The edition was published in January 1971 by Shūeisha International. Hosoe has since expressed uneasiness about being too closely associated with Mishima and his legacy, although his works with the writer comprise an enduring aspect of the photographer's legacy.

== Later work and achievements ==
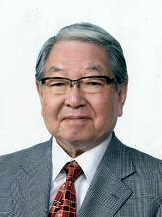
Hosoe in 2010

While Hosoe is often associated with Hijikata and Mishima for the influential, collaborative works he produced with them, he also photographed many of his other artist-friends. These include Simon Yotsuya, a cross-dressing dollmaker, and Kazuo Ohno, a Butoh dance collaborator with Hijikata who developed his own idiosyncratic style and performed until his death at age 103. One photograph captures Ohno, no longer mobile in his old age, dancing with his hands while seated in his wheelchair.

1992 saw a 30-year retrospective "Eikoh Hosoe: Meta" at San Diego's Museum of Photographic Arts. The nineties also saw other activities of Hosoe in America, such as conducting photography workshops in various places that focused on the nude model. His own work from this includes the series Luna Rossa (2000), which was photographed in Alaska, Colorado, and upstate New York. The work is notable for its utilization of darkroom techniques such as solarization and masking that produce effects of an intensity atypical of his previous work.

Hosoe was the director of the Kiyosato Museum of Photographic Arts (Kiyosato, Yamanashi) from the time of its opening in 1995. The Museum held a retrospective of his photographs in 2021. In 2002 he was given a Special Award from the Photographic Society of Japan. He was awarded The Royal Photographic Society's Special 150th Anniversary Medal and Honorary Fellowship (HonFRPS) in recognition of a sustained, significant contribution to the art of photography in 2003.

== Publications ==
- Hosoe, Eikoh, and Yukio Mishima. Killed by roses. Tokyo: Shueisha, 1963.
- Hosoe, Eikoh. 鎌鼬 = Kamaitachi. Tokyo: Gendai Shichosha, 1969.
- Hosoe, Eikoh. Embrace. Ashi sonorama co, 1971.
- Hosoe, Eikoh, Tadanori Yokoo, and Yukio Mishima. Ordeal by roses reedited. Tokyo: Shueisha, 1971.
- Hosoe, Eikoh. 薔薇刑 = Ba*ra*kei = Ordeal by roses: photographs of Yukio Mishima. New York: Aperture, 1985. ISBN 0-89381-169-6.
- Hill, Ronald J. Eikoh Hosoe. Carmel, CA: Friends of Photography, 1986. ISBN 0-933286-46-5.
- Hosoe, Eikoh. Eikoh Hosoe, meta. New York: International Center of Photography, 1991. ISBN 0-933642-16-4.
- Holborn, Mark. Eikoh Hosoe (Aperture Masters of Photography). New York: Aperture, 1999. ISBN 0-89381-824-0.
- Hosoe, Eikoh. 鎌鼬 = Kamaitachi. New York: Aperture, 2005. ISBN 1-931788-80-4. Reprint edition.
- Hosoe, Eikoh, and Kazuo Ohno. Butterfly dream. Kyoto: Seigensha, 2006. ISBN 4-86152-092-4.
- Hosoe, Eikoh. Deadly ashes: Pompeii, Auschwitz, Trinity Site, Hiroshima. Tokyo: Madosha, 2007. ISBN 978-4-89625-086-2.
- Hosoe, Eikoh. 鎌鼬 = Kamaitachi. New York: Aperture, 2009. ISBN 978-1-59711-121-8. Trade edition.
- Eikoh Hosoe. London: Mack, 2021. Edited by Yasufumi Nakamori. ISBN 978-1-913620-24-0.
