= Yōnosuke Natori =

Japanese photographer and editor

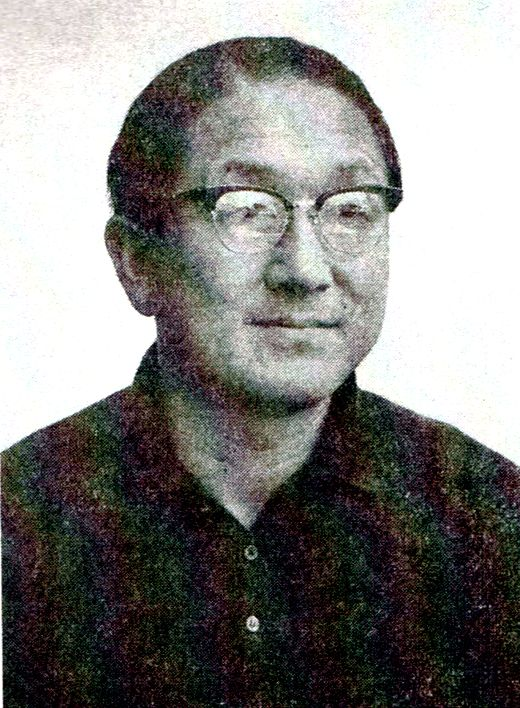
Yōnosuke Natori

Yōnosuke Natori (名取 洋之助, Natori Yōnosuke; September 3, 1910 – November 23, 1962) was a Japanese photographer and editor.

== Biography ==
Born in Tokyo on 3 September 1910, Natori studied at Keio normal school but upon graduation went with his mother to Munich, where he studied at a school of arts and crafts. In 1930 he married while in Germany he married Erna Mecklenburg, a craft designer whom he would collaborate with throughout his career. He became interested in photography and in 1931 obtained a Leica.

After selling his wife Erna's photograph of the aftermath of the Munich Stadtmuseum burning to a local newspaper, in 1931 he got a contract to work as a photographer for Ullstein, which in 1933 sent him to Manchuria to cover the Mukden Incident. After immediate hostilities there had ended, Natori went to Japan and set up the first Nihon Kōbō. When that collapsed he set up the second, working on its magazine Nippon. He went to Berlin for the 1936 Olympics, and thence went directly to the US. Some of the photographs he took while in the US were published by Life and in 1937 he became the first Japanese photographer to be contracted to that magazine. Natori returned to Japan and Japanese-held China, and worked through the wartime years on various Japanese propaganda organs, such as Shanghai and Canton.

In 1947, Natori set up Shūkan San Nyūsu (Weekly Sun News), inspired by Life and similar western magazines (though published on inferior paper). This ended two years later, whereupon Natori edited and also did photography for Iwanami Shashin Bunko (1950–59). He was busy in the fifties and made a number of trips outside Japan: to China in 1956, and to Europe every year from 1959 to 1962. Toward the end of this period he photographed romanesque sculpture and architecture.

Natori died in Tokyo on 23 November 1962.

== Books by Natori and of Natori's works ==
- Grosses Japan. Berlin: Karl Specht, 1937.
- Iwanami Shashin Bunko (岩波写真文庫). Tokyo: Iwanami.
  - 5. Amerikajin (アメリカ人). 1950.
  - 6. Amerika (アメリカ人). 1950.
  - 8. Shashin (写真). 1950.
  - 144. Nagano-ken: Shin-fudoki (長野県：新風土記). 1955.
  - 150. Wakayama-ken: Shin-fudoki (和歌山県：新風土記). 1955.
  - 153. Ōita-ken: Shin-fudoki (大分県：新風土記). 1955.
  - 156. Kanagawa-ken: Shin-fudoki (神奈川県：新風土記). 1955.
  - 164. Ehime-ken: Shin-fudoki (愛媛県：新風土記). 1955.
  - 170. Shiga-ken: Shin-fudoki (滋賀県：新風土記). 1955.
  - 173. Chiba-ken: Shin-fudoki (千葉県：新風土記). 1955.
  - 234. Okayama-ken: Shin-fudoki (岡山県：新風土記). 1957.
- Atarashii shashinjutsu (新しい写真術). Foto Raiburarī 3. Tokyo: Keiyūsha, 1955.
- Sunappu (スナップ). Asahi Camera Kōza. Tokyo: Asahi Shinbunsha, 1956.
- Kumi shashin no tsukurikata (組写真の作り方). Tokyo: Keiyūsha, 1956.
- Bakusekizan sekkuri (麦積山石窟). Tokyo: Iwanami, 1957.
- Romanesuku: Seiyōbi no shigen (ロマネスク：西洋美の始源). Tokyo: Keiyūsha, 1962. A collection of black and white photographs (and a tiny number of color photographs) of Romanesque architectural ornament, painting, statuary, etc. Text — by Munemoto Yanagi (柳宗玄, Yanagi Munemoto) — and captions in Japanese only.
- Ningen dōbutsu mon'yō: Romanesuku bijutsu to sono shūhen (人間動物文様：ロマネスク美術とその周辺). Tokyo: Keiyūsha, 1963. A collection of black and white photographs of Romanesque architectural ornament, painting, statuary, etc., as well as its Roman precursors. Text — by Sahoko Tsuji (辻佐保子, Tsuji Sahoko) — and captions in Japanese only.
- Shashin no yomikata (写真の読みかた). Iwanami Shinsho. Tokyo: Iwanami, 1973.
- Natori Yōnosuke no shigoto: Dainihon (名取洋之助の仕事＝大日本). Tokyo: Seibu Bijutsukan, 1978.
- Amerika 1937 (アメリカ1937). Tokyo: Kōdansha, 1992. ISBN 4-06-205689-5.
- Natori Yōnosuke (名取洋之助). Nihon no Shashinka. Tokyo: Iwanami, 1998. ISBN 4-00-008358-9.
- Doitsu 1936-nen (ドイツ・1936年). Tokyo: Iwanami, 2006. ISBN 4-00-008083-0.

== Books about Natori ==
- Ishikawa Yasumasa (石川保昌). Hōdō shashin no seishun jidai: Natori Yōnosuke to nakamatachi (報道写真の青春時代：名取洋之助と仲間たち). Tokyo: Kōdansha, 1991.
- Mikami Masahiko (三神真彦). Wagamama ippai Natori Yōnosuke (わがままいっぱい名取洋之助). Tokyo: Chikuma Shobō, 1988. ISBN 4-480-82243-7.
- Nakanishi Teruo (中西昭雄). Natori Yōnosuke no jidai (名取洋之助の時代). Tokyo: Asahi Shinbunsha, 1981.

== Other books with works by Natori ==
- Dokyumentarī no jidai: Natori Yōnosuke, Kimura Ihee, Domon Ken, Miki Jun no shashin kara (ドキュメンタリーの時代：名取洋之助・木村伊兵衛・土門 拳・三木淳の写真から) / The Documentary Age: Photographs by Natori Younosuke, Kimura Ihee, Domon Ken, and Miki Jun. Tokyo: Tokyo Metropolitan Museum of Photography, 2001. An exhibition catalogue. The book reproduces 16 of Natori's photographs of the US. Captions in both Japanese and English, other text in Japanese only.
