= Society of Photography Award =

The Society of Photography Award (「写真の会」賞, Shashin no Kai shō) is an award presented annually since 1989 by the (Tokyo-based) Society of Photography (写真の会, Shashin no Kai) for outstanding work in photography.

Recipients of the award are not limited to photographers but instead include people, organizations and companies who have helped photography. In many years more than one award is presented.

== Winners ==
- 1989: Hiroshi Ōshima, Kiyoshi Suzuki, Michio Nakagawa
- 1990: Seiichi Furuya, Takuma Nakahira, Nobuyoshi Araki
- 1991: Yutaka Takanashi, Kurō Doi
- 1992: Nobuyoshi Araki, Isao Hirachi, Kōji Onaka
- 1993: Hiroh Kikai, Jōtarō Shōji, Kazuhiko Ishii
- 1994: Yutaka Senoo
- 1995: Kiyoshi Tanno, Seiichi Motohashi, Itsurō Naraki
- 1996: Masato Seto, Toppan Printing and others
- 1997: Kazuhiko Motomura (editor)
- 1999: Miyako Ishiuchi, Naoyoshi Hikosaka, Kōsai Hori, Ryūji Miyamoto, Masao Mochizuki
- 2000: Yutaka Kanase, Jun'ichi Ōta, Keiko Harada (editor), Masafumi Sanai
- 2001: Rika Noguchi, Masaki Hirano
- 2002: Yoshihiko Seki, Photographers' Gallery, Mariko Terashima
- 2003: Miyako Ishiuchi, Katsuhito Nakazato
- 2004: Asako Narahashi, Ken Kitano
- 2005: Akihiko Hirashima and others
- 2006: Kensuke Kazama, Yōko Matsui
- 2007: Seiichi Furuya
- 2008: Tomoyuki Sakaguchi, Noboru Hama
- 2009: Daidō Moriyama, Ichirō Kojima (posthumous)
- 2010: Shūji Mizobe
- 2011: Shunji Dodo, Man Fujita
- 2012: Yoshiichi Hara, IZU Photo Museum
- 2013: Taiji Matsue, Jun Abe
- 2014: Kyoko Uchida, Kei Ono
- 2015: Go Itami, Phot street
- 2016: Keijiro Kai, Daisuke Yokota

== Sources ==
- (in Japanese) Society of Photography. Awards 1989–98.
- (in Japanese) Society of Photography. Awards 1999–2007
- (in Japanese) Society of Photography. Awards 2008–2009
