= Seiichi =

- Gender: Male

Origin
- Origin: Japanese
- Meaning: Different meanings depending on the kanji used

Seiichi (written: 誠一, 聖一, 清一, 精一, 整一, 成一, 勢一, 盛一 or 晟一) is a masculine Japanese given name. Notable people with the name include:

- Seiichi Akamine (赤嶺 誠一; 1920–1995), Japanese karateka
- Seiichi Endo (遠藤 誠一; 1960–2018), Japanese cult member
- Seiichi Eto (衛藤 晟一; born 1947), Japanese politician
- Seiichi Furuya (古屋 誠一; born 1950), Japanese photographer
- Seiichi Hatano (波多野 精一; 1877–1950), Japanese philosopher
- Seiichi Hishikawa (菱川 勢一; born 1969), Japanese art director
- Seiichi Iju (伊集 盛一), Japanese karateka
- Seiichi Ishii (石井 精一; born 1967), Japanese video game designer
- Seiichi Itō (伊藤 整一; 1890–1945), Imperial Japanese Navy admiral
- Seiichi Iwao (岩生 成一; 1900–1988), Japanese academic, historian and writer
- Seiichi Kanai (金井 清一; born 1940), Japanese golfer
- Seiichi Kaneta (金田 誠一; born 1947), Japanese politician
- Seiichi Kuno (久納 誠一; 1887–1962), Japanese general
- Seiichi Makita (巻田 清一; born 1968), Japanese footballer
- Seiichi Miyake (三宅 精一; 1926–1982), Japanese inventor
- Seiichi Morimura (森村 誠一; 1933–2023), Japanese writer
- Seiichi Motohashi (本橋 成一; born 1940), Japanese photographer
- Seiichi Niikuni (新国 誠一; 1925–1977), Japanese poet and painter
- Seiichi Ogawa (小川 誠一; born 1970), Japanese footballer
- Seiichi Ōmura (大村 清一; 1892–1968), Japanese politician
- Seiichi Osanai (長内 清一; born 1953), Japanese sport wrestler
- Seiichi Ota (太田 誠一; 1945–2024), Japanese politician
- Seiichi Saito (斉藤 誠一; born 1976), Japanese footballer
- Seiichi Sakiya (崎谷 誠一; born 1950), Japanese footballer
- Seiichi Shima (嶋清 誠一; 1920–1945), Japanese baseball player and soldier
- Seiichi Sugano (菅野 誠一; 1939–2010), Japanese aikidoka
- Seiichi Suzuki (philologist) (鈴木 誠一; born 1956), Japanese philologist
- Seiichi Suzuki (figure skater) (鈴木 誠一; born 1976), Japanese figure skater
- Seiichi Tagawa (田川 誠一; 1918–2009), Japanese politician
- Seiichi Takamura (高村 誠一; born 1960), Japanese handball player
- Takebayashi Seiichi (武林 盛一; 1842–1908), Japanese photographer
- Seiichi Tanabe (田辺 誠一; born 1969), Japanese actor
- Seiichi Tanaka (田中 誠一; born 1943), American musician
- Seiichi Tejima (手島 精一; 1850–1918), Japanese educator
- Seiichi Tobata (東畑 精一; 1899–1983), Japanese scientist
- Seiichi Uchikawa (内川 聖一; born 1982), Japanese baseball player
- Seiichi Yamamoto (山本 精一; born 1958), Japanese musician
