= Ina Nobuo Award =

Japanese photography award

The Ina Nobuo Award (伊奈信男賞, Ina-Nobuo-shō) is given annually by the Nikon Salon, an organization of exhibition spaces in Japan that is sponsored by Nikon Corporation. The award was started in 1976; it is named in honor of Nobuo Ina, a photography critic who headed the Nikon Salon from 1968 until his death in 1978.

The award is given to the photographer of what is judged to have been the most outstanding exhibition held in a Nikon Salon within the year running from October through September. As of 2014, the award consists of a statuette, one million yen, and a Nikon D4S camera body and lenses (AF-S NIKKOR 50mm F1.4G).

== Recipients ==
Awards
| | Year | Photographer |
|---|---|---|
| 1 | 1976 | Gashō Yamamura |
| 2 | 1977 | Masahisa Fukase |
| 3 | 1978 | Hiromi Tsuchida |
| 4 | 1979 | Satoshi Kuribayashi |
| 5 | 1980 | Bishin Jumonji |
| 6 | 1981 | Meitoku Itō |
| 7 | 1982 | Shinzō Hanabusa, Shisei Kuwabara |
| 8 | 1983 | Gorō Nakamura |
| 9 | 1984 | Akihisa Masuda |
| 10 | 1985 | Masao Gozu |
| 11 | 1986 | Shigeichi Nagano |
| 12 | 1987 | Ichirō Tsuda |
| 13 | 1988 | Hiroh Kikai |
| 14 | 1989 | Noriaki Yokosuka |
| 15 | 1990 | Chuyung Yoon |
| 16 | 1991 | Akihiro Sakaki (ja) |
| 17 | 1992 | Kiyoshi Suzuki |
| 18 | 1993 | Kunihiro Suzuki |
| 19 | 1994 | Eimu Arino |
| 20 | 1995 | Hiromi Eguchi |
| 21 | 1996 | Yoshikazu Minami |
| 22 | 1997 | Michio Yamauchi |
| 23 | 1998 | Dale Caruso |
| 24 | 1999 | Shunji Dodo |
| 25 | 2000 | Hideaki Uchiyama (ja) |
| 26 | 2001 | Hiroshi Yamazaki |
| 27 | 2002 | Seiichi Furuya |
| 28 | 2003 | Hiroshi Ōshima |
| 29 | 2004 | Kiyotaka Shishito |
| 30 | 2005 | Nobuo Shimose |
| 31 | 2006 | Chihiro Minato |
| 32 | 2007 | Keizō Kitajima |
| 33 | 2008 | Kenshichi Heshiki |
| 34 | 2009 | Jun'ichi Ōta |
| 35 | 2010 | Hitoshi Fugo |
| 36 | 2011 | Yi Sangil |
| 37 | 2012 | Brian Y. Sato |
| 38 | 2013 | Kōgorō Suzuki |
| 39 | 2014 | Osamu Kanemura |

== Bibliography ==
- Ina-Nobuo-shō 20nen (伊奈信男賞20年) / Ina Nobuo Award '76-'95. "Nikon Salon Books 23." Tokyo: Nikon, 1996. An excellently-printed selection of the award-winning works. Text in Japanese only.
