= Michio Yamauchi =

Japanese photographer (born 1950)

Michio Yamauchi (山内 道雄, Yamauchi Michio; born 1950) is a Japanese street photographer focusing on human photography based in Tokyo.

== Life and career ==
Michio Yamauchi was born in a mountain village in Nishimikawa, Aichi (currently part of Toyota City) on October 23, 1950. He studied in the literature department at Waseda University, and after graduating, at 29 years old, entered night school at the Tokyo School of Photography (now Tokyo Visual Arts School (専門学校東京ビジュアルアーツ).

In 1982, the same year he graduated from the Tokyo School of Photography, Yamauchi took part in an independent gallery known as Image Shop CAMP (イメージショップ CAMP). During this time, Yamauchi studied under Daidō Moriyama (森山大道). Afterwards, Yamauchi spent over 10 years as a freelance photographer, mainly participating in independent galleries where he would display photos he took around Tokyo. Yamauchi eventually focused on publishing books of his photography after publishing "To People" (人へ, hito e) and "City" (街, machi). From this point on, Yamauchi began heading overseas as well, while continuing photography in Tokyo.

== Awards ==
In 1997, Yamauchi won the 22nd Ina Nobuo Award for his exhibition "British Territory Hong Kong" (英領HONGKONG, eiryō hongkong) at the Ginza Nikon Salon in Tokyo, Japan. Then, in 2011, he received the 20th Hayashi Tadahiko Award for his exhibition and photo album titled "Keelung" (基隆, kiirun). This award (林忠彦賞) is given annually by Shunan city and the Shunan City Museum of Art and History, started in 1992, in honor of the photographer Tadahiko Hayashi.

== Collections ==
Yamauchi's collections can still currently be seen at the Tokyo Metropolitan Museum of Photography, the Shunan City Museum of Art and History, the Nikon Salon and other places throughout Japan.

== Solo exhibitions ==
- 1982 - "Noraneko - Stray Cats" (野良猫, noraneko), Image Shop CAMP, Shinjuku, Tokyo

"Children" (こども, kodomo), Image Shop CAMP, Shinjuku, Tokyo

- 1983 - "Tokyo vol. 1 - vol. 10" (東京tōkyō), February 1983 - February 1984, Image Shop CAMP, Shinjuku, Tokyo
- 1984 - "Tokyo, That One" (東京、其の壱, tōkyō sonoichi), Minolta Photo Space (Currently, Konica Minolta Plaza), Shinjuku, Tokyo
- 1985 - "Tokyo, Showa Year 60, August" (東京、昭和60年8月, tōkyō, shōwa rokujyūnen hachigatsu), Minolta Photo Space, Shinjuku, Tokyo
- 1986 - "Tokyo, February '83 to February '86" (東京1983.2-1986.2, tōkyō 1983.2-1986.2), Olympus Gallery, Kandaogawa Town, Tokyo
- 1992 - "To People" (人へ, hito e), Minolta Photo Space
- 1994 - "Shanghai Summer" (上海の夏, shanhai no natsu), Ginza Nikon Salon, Ginza, Tokyo
- 1997 - "British Territory Hong Kong" (英領HONGKONG, eiryō hongkong), Ginza Nikon Salon, Ginza, Tokyo
- 1999 - "Waikiki", Ginza Nikon Salon, Ginza, Tokyo
- 2002 - "Tokyo,東京", Ginza Nikon Salon, Ginza, Tokyo
- 2004 - "Calcutta" (India), Konika Minolta Plaza, Shinjuku, Tokyo
- 2005 - "Holiday" (Waikiki), independent gallery, Galleria Q (currently, 3rd District Gallery), Shinjuku, Tokyo
- 2008 - "Tokyo", Sokyusha (independent gallery and bookshop), Shinjuku, Tokyo
- 2010 - "Tokyo", December 2009 (東京 2009.12), tōkyō 2009.12), 3rd District Gallery (independent gallery), Shinjuku, Tokyo

"Keelung" (基隆, kiirun), Sokyusha, Shinjuku, Tokyo

- 2012 - "To People II" (人へII, Hito e, hito e ni), Sekka Borderless Space, Nezu, Tokyo

== Books ==
- City ("街"., machi), Sokyusha, 1992
- To People ("人へ". Archived from the original on 2013-12-30., hito e), independently published, 1992
- Shanghai ("上海". Archived from the original on 2013-12-30., shanhai), independently published, 1995
- "Hong Kong"., Sokyusha, 1997
- Noraneko - Stray Cats ("野良猫". Archived from the original on 2012-03-28., noraneko), Mole, ISBN 4-938628-33-3., 1999
- TOKYO, Tokyo ("TOKYO,東京". Archived from the original on 2014-03-10., tōkyō, tōkyō), Wise Publishing, ISBN 4-89830-150-9., 2003
- "Calcutta". Archived from the original on 2014-03-10., Sokyusha, ISBN 4-902137-22-4., 2003
- Holiday "Waikiki", YK Publishing, 2005
- "Tokyo Up Close"., Rathole Gallery, 2008
- Tokyo 2005-2007 ("東京 2005-2007"., tōkyō 2005-2007), Sokyusha, 2008
- Keelung ("基隆". Archived from the original on 2014-03-10., kiirun), Grafica, ISBN 978-4-903141-12-1, 2010
- Tokyo 2009-2010 ("東京 2009-2010"., tōkyō 2009-2010), Sokyusha, 2012
- To People II ("人へII"., hito e ni), Sokyusha, 2012
- DHAKA Tokyo-kirara sha Co., ltd 2015

== Other publications/mentions ==
- 1984 - Tokyo announced, Camera Mainichi (a magazine published by Mainichi Shimbun), September 1984, pp. 151–174.
- 1985 - Street continuous publication, Camera Mainichi, January to April 1985 .

Snapshots published, Shashin Seikatsu(a monthly magazine published by Tatsumi Publishing)

- 1986 - Photos displayed, Tokyo Human Encyclopedia (Tokyo Paris friendship cities memorial photo exhibition 東京人間図鑑), Paris

Record Tokyo (記録東京, kiroku tōkyō),FACE and NEW FACE in Shashin Jidai(a monthly magazine published by Byakuya Shobo)

- 1987 - Photos displayed, New Photographic Possibilities, Setagaya Art Museum
- 1990 - Photos displayed, Japanese (日本人) projected by Japan Foundation , Moscow, Thailand, etc.
- 1993 - Photos displayed, Breda Photographica (Asahi Camera, October 1993, p. 120), Holland
- 1997 - Critique, Photographic Memory (写真的記憶) by Kazuo Nishii, pp. 179–180, pp. 305–307. Seikyusha, ISBN 4-7872-7072-9.
- 1998 - Photos displayed, 20th Century Car Culture, Kiyosato Museum of Photographic Arts, Yamanashi, Japan
- 2007 - Photos displayed, The New Collections: Vol. 1, Tokyo Metropolitan Museum of Photography, Ebisu, Tokyo

Photos displayed, Portraits of Showa: 1945-1989 , Tokyo Metropolitan Museum of Photography, Ebisu, Tokyo. Guidebook is Shouwa no fukei (昭和の風景), pp. 180–181.
Interview, Asahi Camera, November 2007, P. 235

- 2008 - Photos published, Now, Snapshot Photography is Interesting in Capa (a monthly magazine published by Gakken), October 2008, pp. 126–129.
- 2010 - Photos displayed, 20th Century Portraits: All photographs are Portraits, Tokyo Metropolitan Museum of Photography
- 2011 - Photos displayed, Scenes of Children: Part III Original Scenes Collection, Tokyo Metropolitan Museum of Photography. Guidebook is Kodomo no joukei, (こどもの情景), p. 137.

Photos published, 30 Years of Snapshot Photography in Capa, October 2011, pp. 78-79.
Photos displayed, 20th Tadahiko Hayashi Award Recipient Memorial Photography Exhibition, Shunan City Museum of Art and History, Yamaguchi, Japan

- 2012 - Photos displayed, Tadahiko Hayashi Award 20th Anniversary Exhibition, Kawasaki City Museum, Kanagawa, Japan

Photos published, To People II in Nippon Camera, November 2012, pp. 90-96.
