= Katsuhito Nakazato =

Japanese photographer (born 1956)

Katsuhito Nakazato (中里 和人, Nakazato Katsuhito; born 1956) is a Japanese photographer of the man-made environment, particularly sheds, alleys and night scenes.

== Life and career ==
Nakazato was born in Taki, Mie Prefecture, Japan. When young he enjoyed painting, and he joined a painting club in Hosei University (Tokyo), from which he graduated in geography. It was only when he was 25 that he first had any interest in photography, thinking that a SLR camera his grandmother had bought for him really ought to get some use, and enrolling in a photography class for the public that happened to be taught by Kazuo Kitai, whose teaching he found enormously stimulating. The classes were held once a week for two months, and Nakazato took seriously Kitai's casual answer that yes, he might be able to make it as a photographer. Nakazato would continue to meet Kitai once a month for two years thereafter.

Throughout this time Nakazato was supporting himself via as series of jobs that he disliked, and at 28 he determined that although the prospects of a good income looked bleak, he would indeed be a professional photographer as there was nothing other than photography that he wanted to do. He started with little skill or confidence (as he recalls) in editorial work for magazines, but gradually got into his stride and work picked up.

Nakazato's first photobook, published in 1991, is a portrayal of life on the "man-made wilderness" on the edges of Tokyo Bay, during its rapid changes before the construction of Makuhari Messe. The portraits (as well as the use of monochrome) make this book unusual among Nakazato's works, but it is highly regarded.

His subsequent work has been in colour, with one entire book (as well as major contributions to others) of photographs of sheds, (Note: The relevant photographs have appeared in several books with the word koya (小屋) – on occasion goya (thanks to rendaku) – within their titles. The literal meaning of koya is close to "small house" and its actual meaning encompasses "hut" as well as "shed". "Sheds" is used in this article as shorthand for "sheds (and huts)".) books of photographs of dusk and night scenes in and near Tokyo done in collaboration with the writer Jun Nakano, and more.

In 2001, Nakazato was invited to participate in a crafts event in Ichikawa (Chiba), and, as a renowned photographer of sheds, quickly agreed to construct a shed, a job for which he had no experience. With the help of an architecture student from Waseda University, he was successful in what turned out to be the first of a series of sheds.

Nakazato won the Society of Photography Award in 2003 for his book De Chirico's Shadow and the Photo City Sagamihara newcomer's award in 2005 for his book Roji: Wandering Back Alleys.

Nakazato is a professor at Tokyo Zokei University. He also teaches various workshops elsewhere.

== Exhibitions ==
=== Solo exhibitions ===
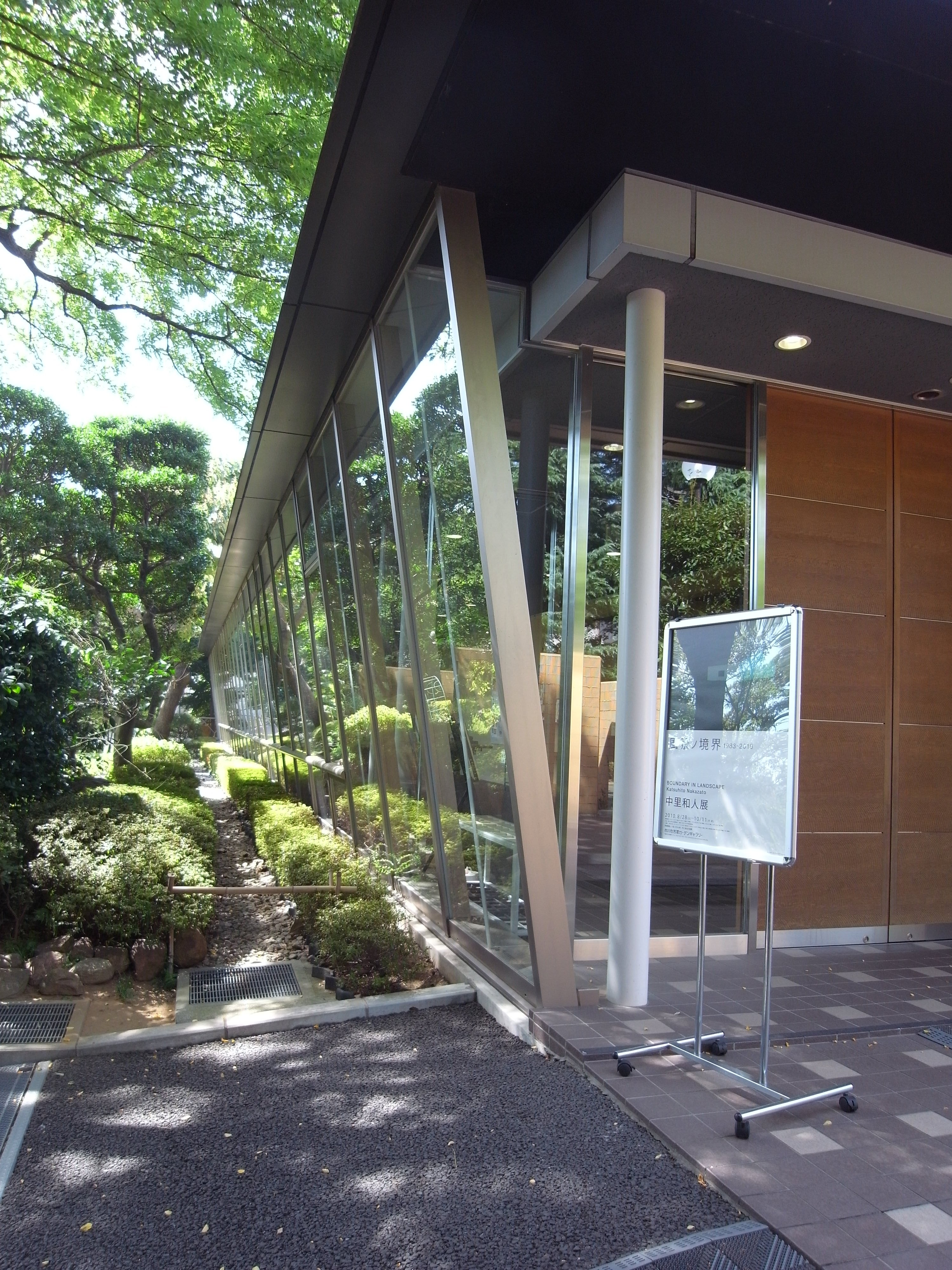
Outside the exhibition "Boundary in Landscape", Yoshizawa Garden Gallery, September 2010

- "Wangan gen'ya" (The man-made wilderness of Tokyo Bay). Olympus Gallery (Shinjuku, Tokyo), 1990.
- "Yume no tezawari" (Touch of dreams). Nikon Salon (Shinjuku, Tokyo), 1995.
- "Fūkei no achira: Miyazawa Kenji, Taneda Santōka no sekai o aruku" (Beyond scenes: Walking in the world of Kenji Miyazawa and Santōka Taneda). Konica Plaza (Shinjuku, Tokyo), 1996.
- "Chihyō-e: jinettai" (Surface of the Earth picture: Terrestrial heat zone). Gallery Saoh & Tomos (Nihonbashi, Tokyo), 1996.
- "Koya: Mushin de honpō na kenchiku" (Sheds: Innocent, wild construction). Inax Gallery (Nagoya), 1999. Inax Gallery (Tokyo and Osaka), 2000.
- "Hyōsō seizō (ikon)" (The superficial: Icons from the deep). Exile Gallery (Kyoto), 2000.
- "Kiriko no machi" (De Chirico's shadow). Uchida Gallery (Azabu Jūban, Tokyo).
- "Yami no hyōkai" / "Rising Darkness". Il Tempo (Kōenji, Tokyo), 2004.
- "Koya no shōzō". Jikonka (Kameyama, Mie), 2004.
- "N machi" (N town). Uchida Gallery (Kayabachō, Tokyo), 2005. Variété Honroku (Hongō, Tokyo), 2006.
- "Tōkei". Mokudosui Gallery (Koshigaya, Saitama), 2006.
- "R". Gallery Tosei (Nakano, Tokyo), 2006.
- "Koya-tachi no hitorigoto" (Monologues of sheds). Billiken Gallery (Aoyama, Tokyo), 2007.
- "Self-build". Roba Roba Cafe (Tokyo), 2008.
- "Nacht. Natur. Das andere Tokio" / "Yoru, shizen, mō hitotsu no Tōkyō" (Night, nature, another Tokyo). Stadtteilarchiv Ottensen (Altona, Hamburg), 2008. Contemporary Art Factory (Mukōjima, Tokyo), 2008.
- "Ultra rinkai yakei" (Ultra: Nightscape of critical area). C Square Gallery, Chukyo University (Nagoya), 2008. Mie Prefectural Art Museum (Tsu, Mie), 2009–2010
- "Ultra". Aoyama Book Center Gallery (Aoyama, Tokyo), 2009.
- "Fūkei no kyōkai 1983–2010" / "Boundary in Landscape". Yoshizawa Garden Gallery (Ichikawa, Chiba), 2010.

=== Group exhibitions ===
- "Bokutō shashinten" (Bokuto photograph exhibition). Warehouse in Kinshichō (Tokyo), 2006.
- "Mieru mono / mienai mono" / "The photograph: What You See and What You Don't". Chinretsukan gallery, Tokyo National University of Fine Arts and Music, 2007.
- "Funagoya: Fūdo to katachi" (舟小屋 風土とかたち) / "Topography of Japanese Boathouses". Inax Gallery (Tokyo, Osaka, Nagoya), 2007.
- "Ishi wa kirei, ishi wa fushigi: Tsugaru" (石はきれい、石は不思議—津軽・石の旅) / "Rocks are Beautiful, Rocks are Mysterious: Tsugaru, Land of Amazing Rocks." Inax Gallery (Tokyo, Osaka, Nagoya), 2007–2008. Rock formations, rocks, polished rocks and rock details in Tsugaru.
- "Tsuchi: Daichi no chikara" (Strength of the Earth). Gunma Museum of Art, Tatebayashi, 2008.
- "Gazai to sozai no hikidashi hakubutsukan" (Drawer museum of art tools and materials). Meguro Museum of Art (Meguro, Tokyo), 2008.
- "Bakumatsu no tankenka: Matsuura Takeshirō to ichijōshiki" (幕末の探検家 松浦武四郎と一畳敷) / "The One-Mat Study of Takeshiro Matsuura, 19th Century Explorer". Inax Gallery (Tokyo, Osaka, Nagoya), 2010. On the explorer and cartographer Matsuura Takeshirō.

== Publications ==
=== Books by Nakazato ===
- Wangan gen'ya (湾岸原野) / The Man-Made Wilderness of Tokyo Bay 1983–1989. Tokyo: Rokkō Shuppan, 1991. ISBN 4-8453-9036-1. Black-and-white photographs of life at the edges of Tokyo Bay. (All of Nakazato's subsequent books are of colour photographs.)
- Koya no shōzō (小屋の肖像) / Portraits of Sheds. Tokyo: Media Factory, 2000. ISBN 4-8401-0130-2. Photographs of the outsides of home-made sheds of all kinds across Japan. Captions and texts in both Japanese and English.
- Kiriko no machi (キリコの街) / De Chirico's Shadow. Wides Photo Collection 12. Tokyo: Wides, 2002. ISBN 4-89830-130-4. Photographs of places and architectural and other detail, in daylight and at night. Captions and short text in both Japanese and English.
- Roji (路地) / Roji: Wandering Back Alleys. Tokyo: Seiryū Shuppan, 2004. ISBN 4-86029-099-2. Photographs of back alleys across Japan. Text and captions are in Japanese only.
- R. Tokyo: Tōseisha, 2006. ISBN 4-88773-051-9. Paired photographs of bends in roads across Japan. Captions (locations and dates) in English, short text in Japanese.
- Tōkei (東亰) / Tokyo Mukojima 2000–2006. Koshigaya: Mokudosui, 2006. ISBN 4-86219-020-0. Photographs of Mukōjima by day and night. No captions; an afterword in both English and Japanese.
- Yotsu no machi (4つの町) / Geography of Colors. Tokyo: Seiryū Shuppan, 2007. ISBN 978-4-86029-232-4. Pastel colours of the Ryūkyū islands, black of Mie and Aichi, the bright colours of Aomori, and the white of Japan in the snow. Captions in Japanese only but an afterword in both Japanese and English.
- Ultra. Tokyo: Nippon Camera-sha, 2008. ISBN 978-4-8179-2115-4. Photographs taken at night. Captions in Roman script, and (minimal) text in both Japanese and English.

=== Book collaborations ===
- Iwate-ken Poran-chō aza nanatsu mori e: Miyazawa Kenji e no tabi (岩手県ポラン町字七つ森へ 宮沢賢治への旅). Tokyo: Kaiseisha, 1995. ISBN 4-03-529380-6. Text by Takao Wajun (和順高雄). A travel guide to and picture book of Iwate (and particularly Morioka and Hanamaki), inspired by and linked to the travels of Kenji Miyazawa. In Japanese only.
- Nukemichi, yorimichi, Santōka: Kyūshū o meguru tabi (ぬけ道、より道、山頭火: 九州をめぐる旅). Tokyo: Kaiseisha, 1995. Text by Takao Wajun. ISBN 4-03-529400-4. A travel guide to and picture book of Kyūshū, inspired by and linked to the travels of Santōka Taneda. In Japanese only.
- Nihonjin ni aitai: Tazune aruita 34-nin no shōzō (日本人に会いたい たずね歩いた34人の肖像). Tokyo: Art Digest, 1999. ISBN 4-900455-47-4. Text by Hidetoshi Matsui (松井英俊). The title means "I/we want to meet (some) Japanese people: Portraits of 34 people I/we went around to meet". Matsui interviews the 34 people – photographers, scholars, musicians, and so forth – and for each, Nakazato supplies four or so black-and-white photographs: some of them fairly straightforward portraits, but others showing the person at work.
- Koya: Hataraku kenchiku (小屋 働く建築). Tokyo: Inax, 1991. ISBN 4-87275-810-2. By Nakazato, Kunihiro Andō (安藤邦廣) and Toshikatsu Ue (宇江敏勝). The title means "Sheds: Working architecture". More than half of this lavishly illustrated book about sheds consists of colour and black-and-white photographs and text by Nakazato; many of the photographs later reappear in Portraits of Sheds.
- Tōkaidō gojūsan tsugi kikō: Yonhyakunen kaidō no dorama (東海道五十三次紀行 : 四〇〇年街道のドラマ). Tokyo: Moku Shuppan, 2001. ISBN 4-900682-60-8. Text by Hiroshi Takada (高田宏).
- Koya no chikara (小屋の力) / Micro Architecture. Tokyo: World Photo Press, 2001. ISBN 4-8465-2310-1. Ed Kiyoko Senba (仙波喜代子) and Kesaharu Imai (今井今朝春). Nakazato is one of numerous contributors to this large anthology about sheds. Despite its English alternative title, in Japanese only.
- Ouma ga toki (逢魔が時) / Dusk: Before Night Falls. Tokyo: Pie, 2003. ISBN 4-89444-296-5. Text by Jun Nakano (中野純). Color photographs of dusk. Biographical and other information in both Japanese and English, but the main texts in Japanese only.
- Inochi: Shiage no mei-serifu (いのち 仕上げの名台詞). Tokyo: Shōgakukan, 2003. ISBN 4-09-411541-2. Ed. Chōkitsu Kurumatani (車谷長吉).
- Nagaya meiro (長屋迷路) / Row House Maze. Tokyo: Pie, 2004. ISBN 4-89444-383-X. Colour photographs of nagaya in Sumida (Tokyo). Text by Jun Nakano. Most of the text is in Japanese only, but there is a little in English.
- Yotabi (夜旅). Tokyo: Kawade Shobō Shinsha, 2005. ISBN 4-309-26850-1. Text by Jun Nakano.
- Funagoya: Fūdo to katachi (舟小屋 風土とかたち) / Topography of Japanese Boathouses. Tokyo: Inax, 2007. ISBN 978-4-87275-839-9. Photographs by Nakazato. The book of the 2007 exhibition.
- Tokyo: Exploring the City of the Shogun. Tokyo: Kodansha International, 2007. ISBN 978-4-7700-3033-7. Text (in English only) by Sumiko Embutsu. A lavishly illustrated tourist souvenir cum guide to seven suggested walks around Tokyo, concentrating on areas that are older or that have historical significance.
- Ishi wa kirei, ishi wa fushigi: Tsugaru (石はきれい、石は不思議—津軽・石の旅) / Rocks are Beautiful, Rocks are Mysterious: Tsugaru, Land of Amazing Rocks. Tokyo: Inax, 2007. ISBN 978-4-87275-841-2. Text by Hidemichi Hori (堀秀通), Shin'ichi Nakazawa (中沢新一), Hikaru Okuizumi and Nakazato; photographs by Nakazato. The book of the 2007–2008 exhibition.
- Koya-tachi no hitori-goto (こやたちのひとりごと). Tokyo: Billiken Shuppan, 2007. ISBN 978-4-939029-46-2. Text by Shuntarō Tanikawa. A picture book for children, with Nakazato's photographs of sheds.
- Tōkyō saihate kankō (東京サイハテ観光). Tokyo: Kōtsū Shinbunsha, 2008. ISBN 978-4-330-98208-3. Text by Jun Nakano. The title means something like "tourism in the farthest reaches of Tokyo"; the book is a guide to small, quirky areas at the edge of the megalopolis rather than administrative area, for example reaching northward to Shibukawa at the edge of the Kantō plain. The photographs are black-and-white and colour, of day and night scenes.
- Self-build: Jibun de ie o tateru to iu koto (セルフビルド 自分で家を建てるということ). Tokyo: Kōtsū Shinbunsha, 2008. ISBN 978-4-330-99808-4. Text by Osamu Ishiyama (石山修武). A book showing how to build one's own house.
- Bakumatsu no tankenka: Matsuura Takeshirō to ichijōshiki (幕末の探検家 松浦武四郎と一畳敷) / The One-Mat Study of Takeshiro Matsuura, 19th Century Explorer. Tokyo: Inax, 2010. ISBN 978-4-87275-852-8. On Matsuura Takeshirō. Text by various people. The book of the 2010 exhibition.

=== Other collaborations ===
- Roba no oto sagashi (ロバの音さがし). Kromhoorn Records, 1998. Nakazato provides the photographs for the booklet.
- Aoi yoru no tabi: Tankinshō II (蒼い夜の旅 炭琴抄II) / Pale Night Trip: Tan Kin Sho II. OCM Records, 2007. Music by Shunsuke Mizuno (水野俊介), photographs by Nakazato.
- Yoru e ikou (夜へ行こう). May 2008 issue of the magazine Takusan no fushigi (たくさんのふしぎ). Tokyo: Fukuinkan, 2008. Text by Jun Nakano, photographs by Nakazato, for this issue of a monthly scientific magazine for children.
