= Masao Gozu =

Japanese photographer and sculptor (born 1946)

Masao Gozu (郷津 雅夫, Gōzu Masao; ごうづ まさお, born 1946) is a Japanese photographer and sculptor who works in and around New York City.

== Biography ==
Born in Nagano Prefecture in 1946, Gozu attended Toyo Institute of Art and Design (Tōyō Bijutsu Senmon Gakkō) until 1970. The next year he moved to New York, where he studied, graduating in 1973 from Brooklyn Museum Art School. There he photographed people looking out of windows. These photographs are carefully made, with perspective correction. They constituted his first solo exhibition, at O. K. Harris Works of Art in 1980. A second series (1976–81) is of a view, with framing precisely fixed, into the window of Harry's Bar (later renamed Harold's Bar). A third series is "264", identically framed views of 264 the Bowery, occupied by a succession of the destitute and derelict.

Gozu's work has been shown in the Ginza Nikon Salon as well as in galleries in New York. He won the 10th Ina Nobuo Award.

In December 1990, he won Le prix special du jury, Mois de la photo 90, Paris.

While Gozu continues to show his photography in Japan, Europe and the United States, since 1984 he has also been reconstructing windows from old buildings. He sees this as an evolving aspect of the same aesthetic as his photographs. While his photographs have frequently employed windows as the frame for the subject, with his sculpture he has taken this idea one step further, by making the window itself his subject.

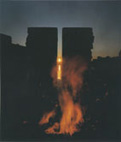
Fire, 1988

In 1988, Gozu showed for the first time both sculpture and photographs at O. K. Harris Gallery in New York. He photographed his sculptures installed at different locations in Brooklyn, Queens, and New Jersey. Each of the five images represented a component of the Go Dai (a Buddhist concept of the five elements that shape the physical world). These include Sea, Sun, Wave, Fire and Cloud. The windows were situated in a specific location at a particular time of year so that the photographs of the windows reflected the sun between the Twin Towers of the World Trade Center. He sees these compositions as symbolic of Niten (two gods). Sun became part of the K & B Plaza sculpture collection in New Orleans, and was later moved to the New Orleans Museum. Cloud became part of Martin Marguiles’ sculpture collection in Florida.

Gozu continues work on this stage and has had a variety of shows at O. K. Harris in New York and elsewhere. Highlights of these shows include:

- Seven Reconstructed Facades, February, 1991
- Eleven Reconstructed Windows (The 25th St. Series, 1992), September, 1993
- Reconstructed Facades (276 W. 118th St., New York, NY), January, 1996
- Reconstructed Facades (23-25 W. 137th St., New York, NY), January, 1999
- Reconstruction—Black and Red, January, 2005
- Stream (Pond Eddy, NY), March, 2009

== Books by Gozu ==
- In New York (Feb. 1971–Nov. 1980). Self-published. 1981.
- In New York (Feb. 1971–Dec. 1984). Self-published. 1985.
- In New York (Feb. 1971–Apr. 1990). Self-published. 1990.
- New York. Tokyo: Advertise Communication, 1990. ASIN B0040UPXF8. Captions (place and time) in English, texts by Ivan Karp and Kōtarō Iizawa in Japanese and English.

== Gallery ==
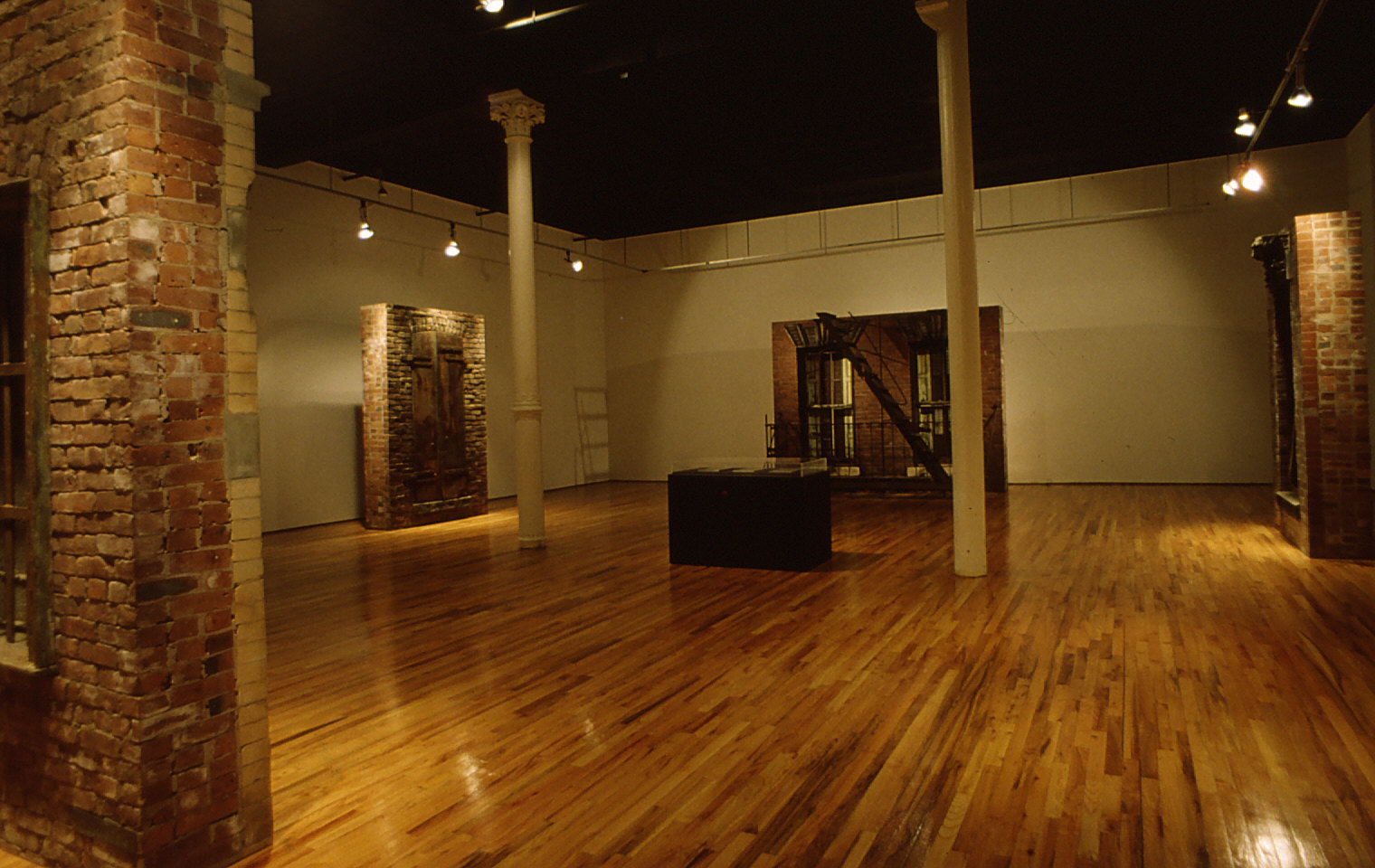
"Seven Reconstructed Facades (February, 1991)"

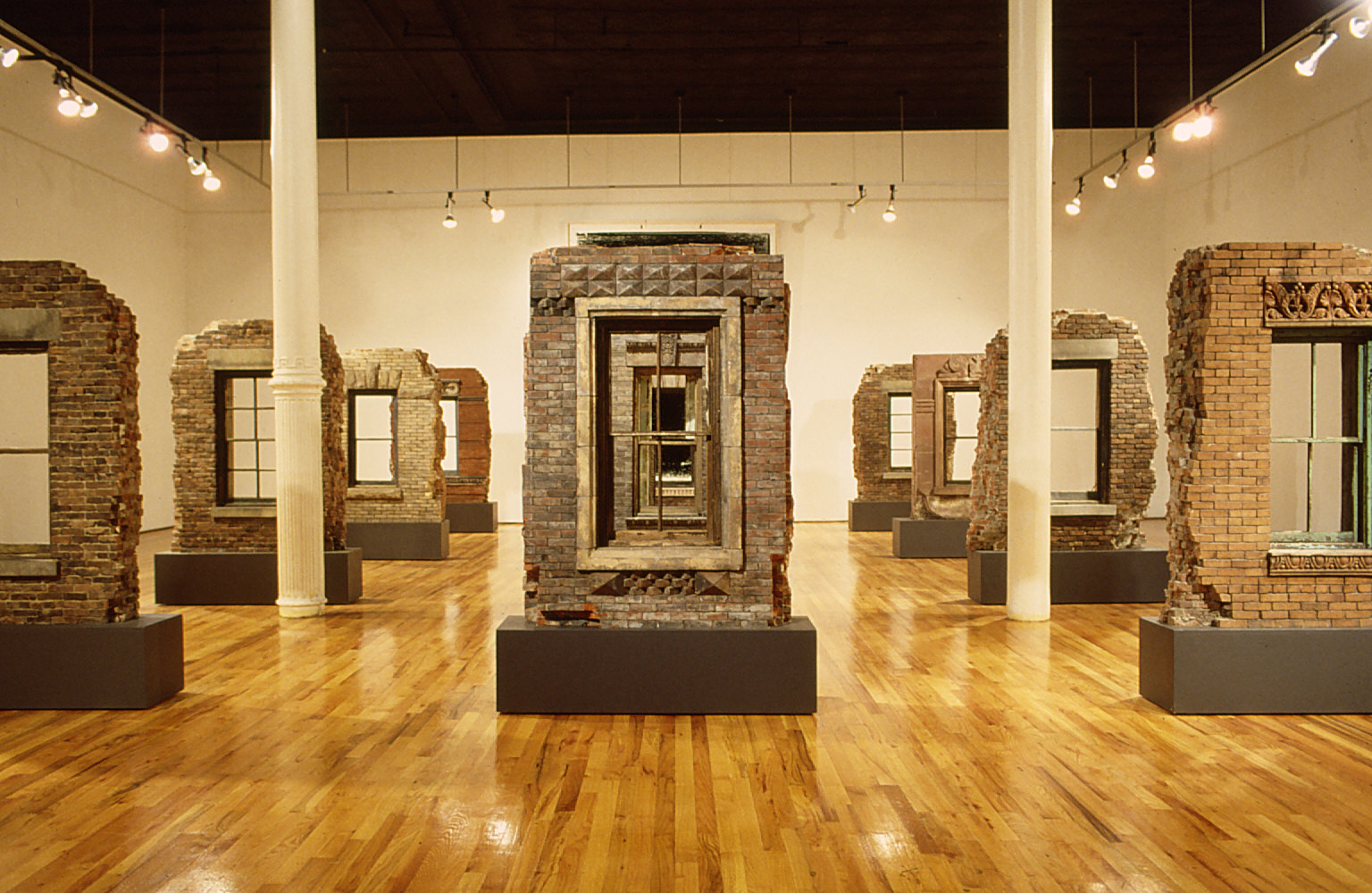
"Eleven Reconstructed Windows: The 25th St. Series, 1992 (September, 1993)"

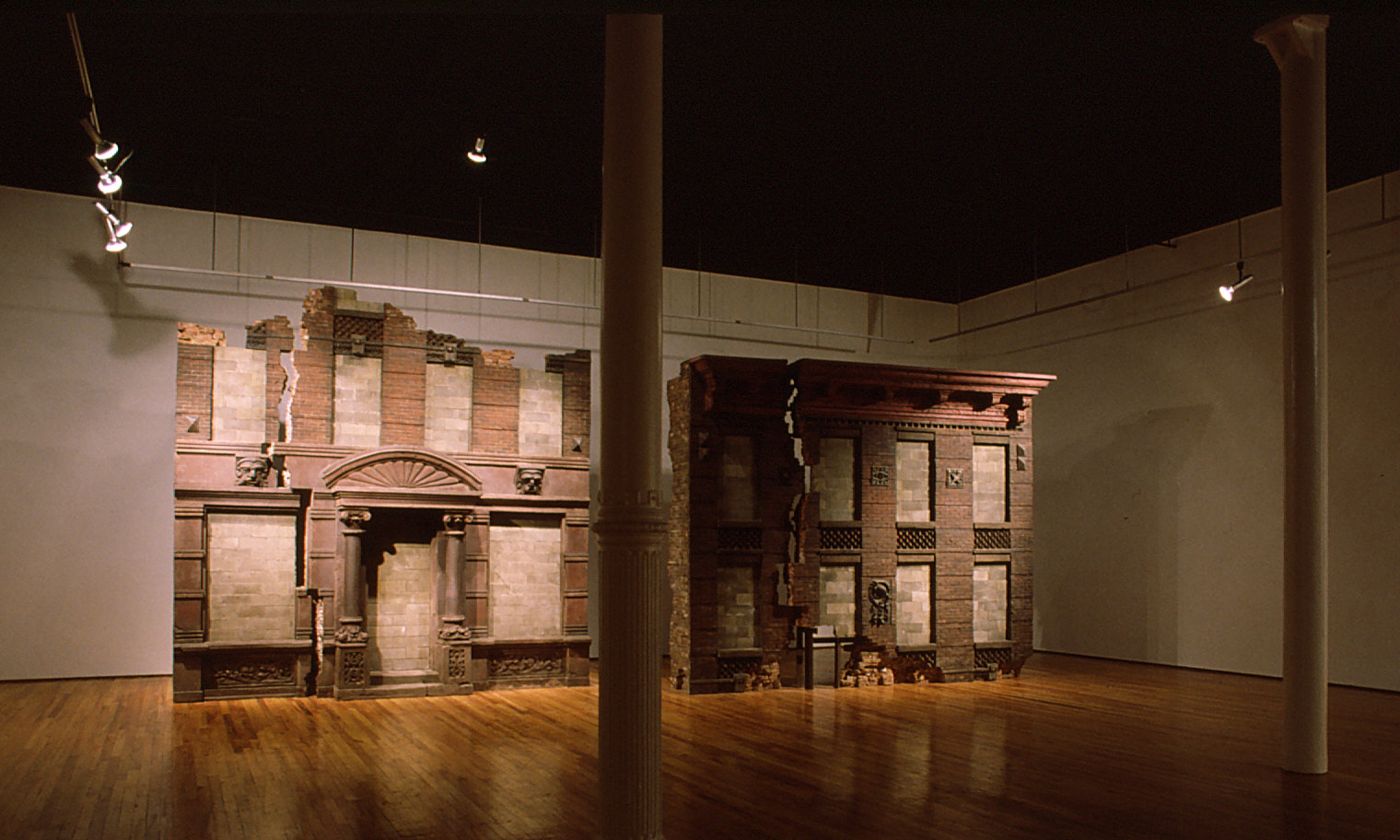
"Reconstructed Facades: 276 W. 118th St., New York, NY (January, 1996)"

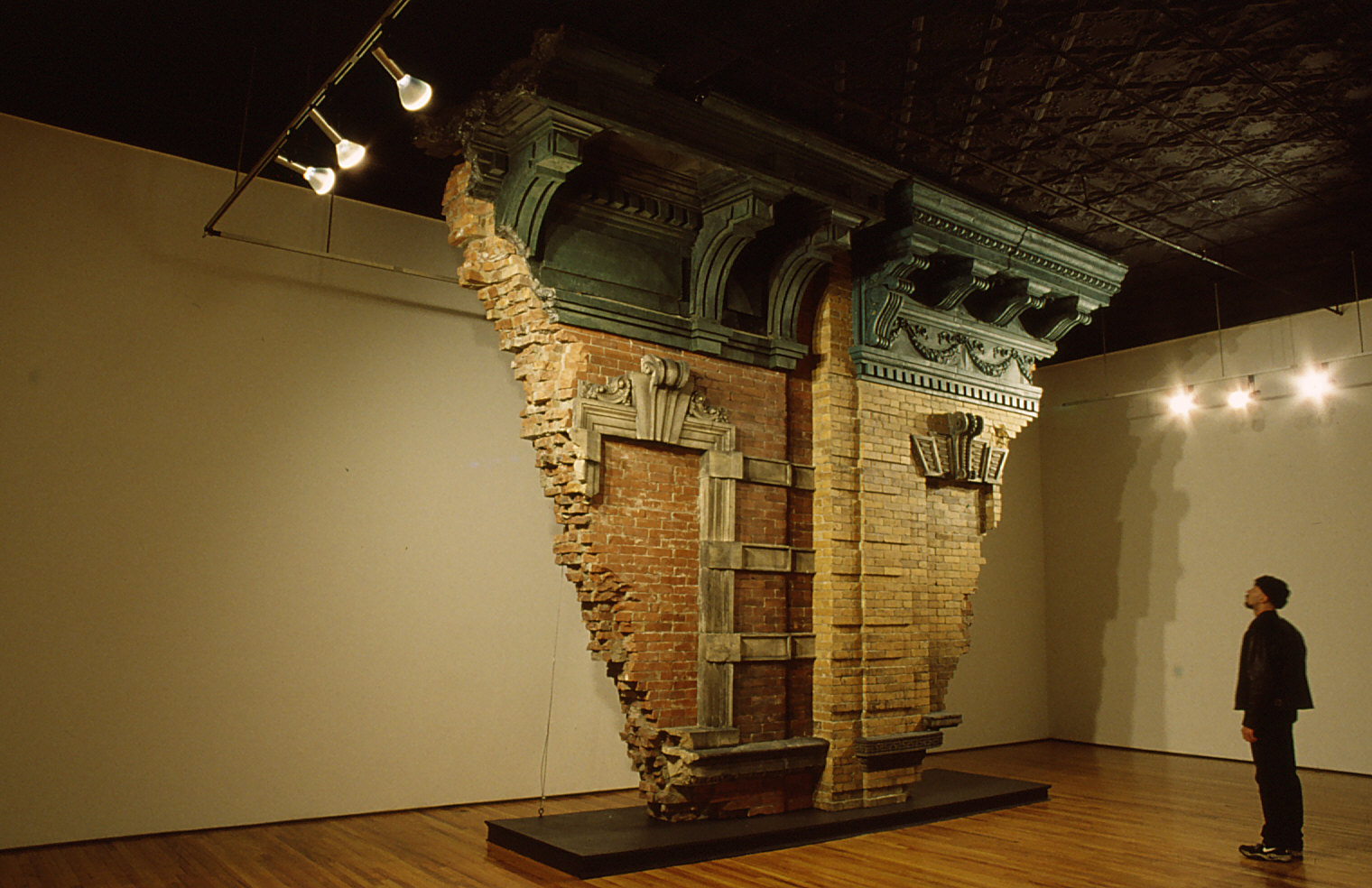
"Reconstructed Facades: 23-25 W. 137th St., New York, NY (January, 1999)"

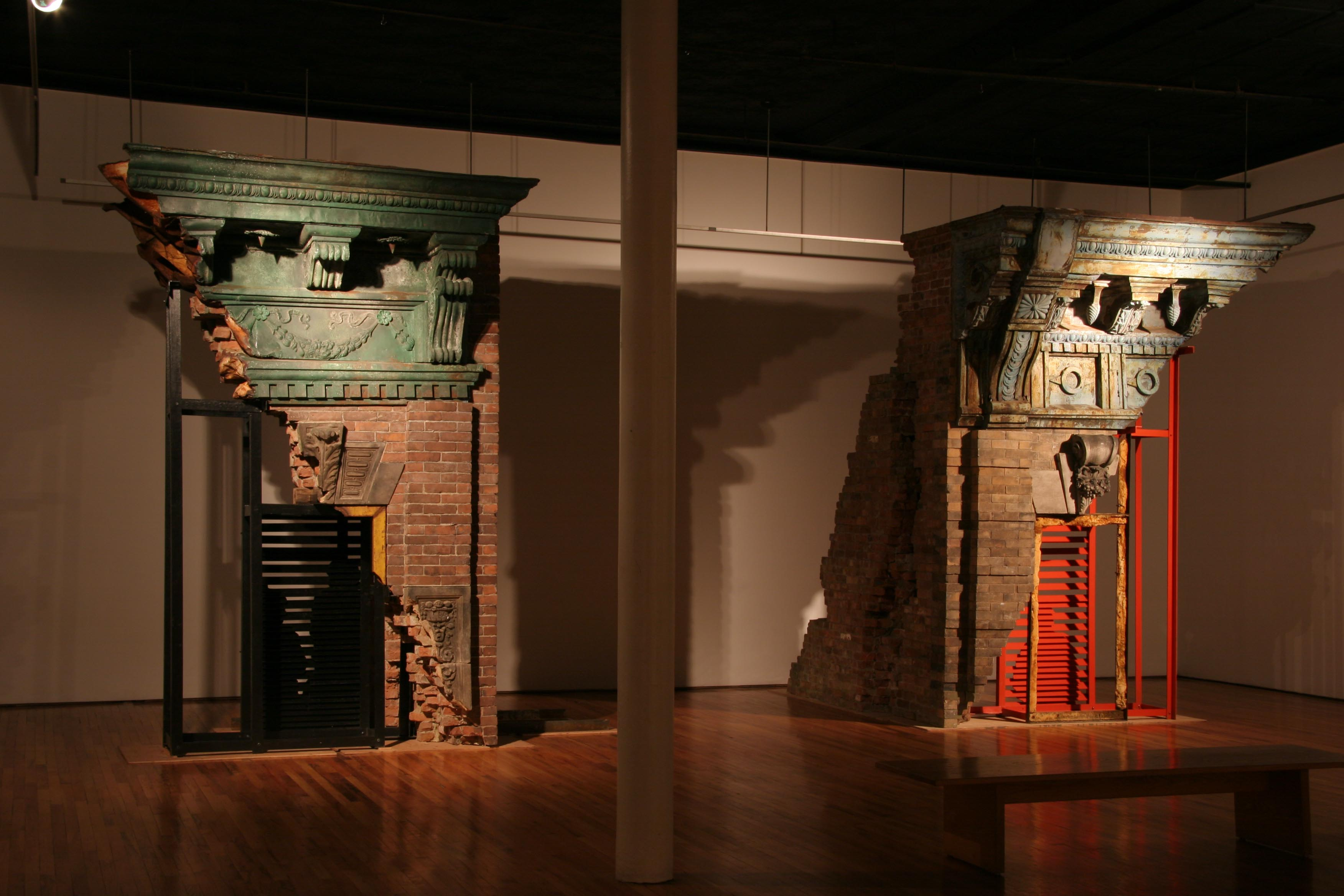
"Reconstruction—Black and Red (January, 2005)"

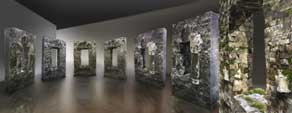
"Stream: Pond Eddy, NY (March, 2009)"
