= Kenshichi Heshiki =

Okinawan photographer

Kenshichi Heshiki (平敷 兼七, Heshiki Kenshichi; 1948 — October 2009) was an Okinawan photographer. He is known for his dedication to the subject of Okinawa and often photographed quiet scenes of Okinawans who lived on the margins of society. Heshiki's understated photographs of daily life in Okinawa have been differentiated from images taken by mainland photographers who visited the islands to shoot the protests and tension surrounding Okinawa's reversion back under Japanese control. Heshiki was most prolific between the late 1960s to the 1990s during which he travelled to and photographed various remote areas within the Ryukyu Archipelago. These images feature in his seminal book Lungs of a Goat which earned him the prestigious Ina Nobuo Award.

Heshiki was also active in fostering a local arts community and throughout his career frequently collaborated with other Okinawan artists. He is regarded as a pioneer of photography within Okinawa and has influenced contemporary photographers such as Ryūichi Ishikawa.

== Education and background ==
Heshiki was born in Nakijin, USCAR. His father, who worked selling surplus US military engines, often brought Heshiki to the markets of Naha. As his father mingled with clients at restaurants that also doubled as brothels, Heshiki was often looked after by the women working there. His childhood affection and admiration for these women later materialized into a numerous photographic series regarding women involved in sex work. He developed an interest photography as a high school student at Okinawa Technical High School where he studied drawing and design. Growing up, Heshiki had a stutter and often described himself as a very reserved child whom feared speaking up. He credited photography for helping him gather the ability to speak to others.

Heshiki relocated to Tokyo in 1967 and attended the Tokyo Photography University (currently Tokyo Polytechnic University). Although Heshiki intended to study photography, he was placed in the school's engineering department due to a mistake by his high school teacher in the application paperwork. He left less than two years later to pursue photography at the Tokyo College of Photography, where he received his undergraduate degree in 1971. In his formative university years, Heshiki was exposed to the candid snapshots of prominent Western photographers, such as Robert Frank and William Klein, whose work came to be described with the Japanese term konpora (an abbreviation of "contemporary photography”). He was also drawn to Diane Arbus and her intimate photographs representing marginalized people. Heshiki owned a copy of Arbus's 1972 monograph, released as a part of an exhibition at MoMA in New York, and had the essay translated into Japanese.

== Career ==
From his early years as an undergraduate, Heshiki gravitated towards photographing his hometown of Okinawa and was compelled by a strong necessity to capture images of the Okinawans who were often disregarded as insignificant and "nameless". Heshiki exemplified his conviction in a journal entry from 1970, writing “兼七、お前は写真を撮るんだぞ、誰が撮るんだ、撮れなければこの沖縄を” (≈ “Kenshin, you take photos, who will take these photos, you must photograph this Okinawa”). When riots in 1968 caused the Tokyo College of Photography to go into lockdown, Heshiki travelled back to Okinawa and photographed the types of women working in brothels that he met as a child for his series “Women Who Refused the Reversion [of Okinawa] to Japan”, later published in the Shūkan Post (1971). Although translated into English ambiguously as “women”, the original title of the series “本土復帰” を拒絶する娼婦たちの現在 does not conceal their status as sex workers. As an undergraduate, Heshiki also created the series Okinawa, Nantōryō, documenting a dormitory hall in Tokyo designated for Okinawans, and My Native Land: Okinawa, images of bullet proof vest factory in Urasoe, which was published in Camera Mainichi (March, 1970). As leading photographers coming from mainland Japan, such as Shōmei Tōmatsu and Daidō Moriyama, were photographing US forces in Okinawa, Heshiki, who returned to Okinawa in 1972, directed his lens at Okinawa's underbelly. He captured intimate photos of fisherman, prostitutes, the poor, and burakumin in their workplaces and homes. He also traveled far from the centers of action in Naha and base towns, and shot in remote areas such as the Daito Islands, Iheya, Yaeyama, and Miyako. Although US soldiers are noticeably absent from his images, the inescapable US military presence can be traced in building signs and goods.

Heshiki's photographs, particularly those of prostitutes, reveal the degree of closeness that Heshiki had with his subjects. While his identity as a fellow Okinawan granted Heshiki some proximity to his subjects, he has repeatedly emphasized the importance of forging human connections for his shooting method. He typically took a long time to familiarize himself with people before he started photographing them, and was adamant about refusing to shoot without some form of consent. In the case of the sex workers, Heshiki became so close to some of these women that they viewed each other as family.

=== Collaborations ===
Heshiki created numerous publications with other Okinawan artists over the course of his career. He served as the photographer for Okinawan sculptor, painter and arts educator Kenshin Yamashiro in his book Gods of Nice Bottom Hairy (1979). Heshiki also photographed sumi-e painter Michikio Kaneshiro, who was suffering from terminal diseases, and potter Takemi Shima. He joined colleagues such as Mao Ishikawa to publish the Great Ryūkyū Photography Book (1990), one of the first attempts to present the history of Okinawan photography through images submitted by ordinary Okinawans.

==== 美風 (Bifū) ====
In 1985, Heshiki launched the photography magazine 美風 (Bifū) which produced 12 issues between 1985 and 1990. Each issue included at least one photo series by Heshiki and features from fellow Okinawan photographers Mao Ishikawa, Tatsuhiko Kano, and Minoru Yamada, among others. The inner pages of the magazine were printed in black and white or on blueprint paper, while the covers featured woodblock prints by illustrator José Joaquín Sánchez Espina or hand written font.

In this short lived magazine, Heshiki published some of his more well known series including 料亭 (≈ Ryōtei) (Bifū No. 3, 1986) and しまじり (≈ Shimajiri) (Bifū No. 7, 1987). He also photographed Okinawan dancer Chisato Tomihara for Bifū No. 10 and No. 12. In stelec issues, Heshiki openly approached political themes, notably the series わたしたちにも なにかいわせて (≈ Let us say something as well) (Bifū No. 8, 1988) for which he photographed a peace statue constructed in front of a mass grave that was said to be vandalized in retaliation for the burning of the Hinomaru flag at the National Sports Festival in Okinawa (1987).

=== 山羊の肺 (Lungs of a Goat) ===
Heshiki was approached by Nakajo Hajime, a student at Japan University of Economics University working part time at NHK when they first met, about the possibility of creating a photobook for Heshiki's work. As Heshiki was interested in the perception of his images by a younger generation, the two collaborated in selecting images taken over the span of nearly forty years. Photographs of mass tombs and remnants of the war, banal scenes of daily life, landscapes, and festivals are all interwoven in Heshiki's critically acclaimed book Lungs of a Goat (2007). The book is separated into four sections: the first features a general survey of images from Okinawa, many of which had never been published; the remaining three section 渚の人々, 職業婦人たち, and 俑 include photos from series published in earlier photobooks and the magazine Bifū.

The title Lungs of a Goat was originally suggested by Nakajo when he saw a photo of a slaughtered goat and found a resemblance between the goat's predicament and the exploitation of Okinawans. For Heshiki, the specificity of a goat's lung encompassed a sense of both life and death – goats commonly die by suffocation upon birth so the presence of working lungs could be interpreted as a symbol of resilience and life.

Lungs of a Goat was presented as an exhibitions at the Nikon Salon in Ginza and Osaka for which he received the 33rd Ina Nobuo Award in 2008.

== Death and legacy ==
Just as Heshiki was beginning to gain greater recognition from his book and his feature in the exhibition Okinawa Prism 1872–2008 at the National Museum of Modern Art Tokyo, he died suddenly from pneumonia in 2009. In the same year of his passing, he was selected as a finalist for the 8th Domon Ken Award.

After Heshiki's death, members of his family took over his estate and opened a gallery in Urasoe under his namesake in 2015. His photographs were also included in the group exhibition Experiments in the Art of Japanese Photography from 1968 to 1972 for the Coming New World at the Museum of Fine Arts in Houston, making it the first time his work was shown in a major museum outside of Japan. In 2016, Dad the Photographer: Posthumous Works of Heshiki Kenshichi was published by Mirai-sha and an episode of the nationally broadcast NHK Sunday Museum was dedicated to Heshiki.

== Selected exhibitions ==
- 2006: Women from Kinbu (Shinjuku Agua de Beber / Gallery Ginza Arts Laboratory, Tokyo)
- 2007: 沖縄文化の軌跡, 1872 — 2007 (≈ Trajectory of Okinawan Culture 1872 — 2007) (Okinawa Prefectural Museum and Art Museum)
- 2008: Lungs of a Goat Okinawa 1981–2005 (Nikon Salon Ginza / Osaka)
- 2008: Okinawa Prismed 1872–2008 (The National Museum of Modern Art Tokyo)
- 2015: Experiments in the Art of Japanese Photography from 1968 to 1972 for the Coming New World (Museum of Fine Arts, Houston)
- 2017: Photographs of Heshiki Kenshichi: Okinawa, Beloved One, Time (Tokyo Polytechnic University, Shadai Gallery)
- 2020: Photography in the Ryukyu Islands (Tokyo Photographic Art Museum)

== Selected publications ==
- Yamashiro, Kenshin. 美尻毛原の神々(Gods of Nice Bottom Hairy). Photography by Heshiki Kenshichi and Hikoshi Miyagi. Self-published, 1979.
- 金城美智子・光と影の世界 (Michiko Kinjō: The World of Light and Shadow). Self-published, 1991.
- 沖縄を救った女性達 (Women Who Saved Okinawa). Self-published, 1992.
- 沖縄の祭りー宮古の狩俣島尻の夏プーズ (Summer Harvest Festival in Karimata Shimajiri in Miyako). Self-published, 1992.
- 沖縄戦で死んでいった人達のための「俑」(Bucket for Those Who Died in the Okinawan Battle). Self-published, 1992.
- 島武己 (Takemi Shima). Self-published, 1996.
- 山羊の肺 (Lungs of a Goat: Okinawa 1968–2005). Tokyo: Kage Shobō, 2007. Reprinted in 2018.

== Sources ==
- Heshiki, Kenshichi. Lungs of a Goat. Reprint. Lungs of a Goat: Okinawa 1968–2005. Reprint. Edited by Hajime Nakajo.Tokyo: Kage Shobō, 2018.
- Heshiki, Kenshichi. Dad the Photographer: Posthumous Works of Heshiki Kenshichi. Tokyo: Mirai-sha, 2016.
- Nakamori, Yasufumi. For a New World to Come: Experiments in Japanese Art and Photography, 1968–1979. Houston: The Museum Fine Arts Houston: New Haven; London: Distributed by Yale University Press, 2015.
- Photography in the Ryukyu Islands. Tokyo: TOP Museum, 2020.
- Kamitani, Kouki. "沖縄の肖像（1）平敷兼七: Interview." BAKU magazine for inspire. April 21, 2008. 1–6. https://issuu.com/alesca20/docs/heishiki_interview_baku
- Kamitani, Kouki. "沖縄の肖像（1）平敷兼七: 「無名の人々」に限りない愛着 長い年月かけ、人の優しさ捉える." BAKU magazine for inspire. April 21, 2008. 1–9. https://issuu.com/alesca20/docs/heishiki_article_baku
