= Jun Abe =

Japanese street photographer and educator

Jun Abe (阿部 淳, Abe Jun; born 1955) is a Japanese street photographer and educator who lives and works in Osaka. As of autumn 2014, he has produced six books of photographs of people in cities, including Citizens: 1979–1983, which won the Society of Photography Award. He was the official photographer of the butoh dance group Byakko-sha (白虎社) from 1982 to 1994.

== Life and work ==
Abe was born in Osaka. He studied photography at Ōsaka Shashin Senmon Gakkō (now Visual Arts Osaka).

From 1982 to 1994 he was the official photographer for Byakko-sha (白虎社), a butoh dance group based in Kyoto. In this capacity he travelled extensively in 1982 and 1983.

From 2002 Abe has taught at the Visual Arts Osaka college. He has been a member of the Osaka-based photography collective running Vacuum Press since 2006. Since 2013 he has been represented by Hatten Gallery.

== Publications ==
- クリーチャーズ ...... 神の獣たち = Kurīchāzu: Kami no kemono-tachi = Creaturers. (Note: The colophon shows the short Japanese title クリーチャーズ (Kurīchāzu) alone. The subtitle 神の獣たち (Kami no kemono-tachi) appears nowhere other than the title page. Creaturers [sic] appears on the front cover and title page and also in the list of exhibitions. It appears to be a mistake, because (if it rhymed with "treasurers"), "creaturers" would have different katakana (most likely クリーチュラーズ); as it is, the pronunciation of the Japanese title matches that of "creatures".) Village, 1989. ISBN 4-938598-04-3. Black and white photographs; essay by Isamu Ōsuka (大須賀勇) and artist chronology in Japanese.
- 大阪 = Ōsaka. Osaka: Vacuum, 2007. ISBN 9784990328801. Vacuum Press 1. Colour photographs. (Note: The publisher's page about Ōsaka (as archived by the Wayback Machine on 8 September 2014) is here.)
- 市民: 1979–1983 = Citizens: 1979–1983. Osaka: Vacuum, 2009. ISBN 9784990328832. Vacuum Press 4. Black and white photographs; no captions or other text. (Note: The publisher's page about Citizens (as archived by the Wayback Machine on 3 April 2016) is here.)
- 黒白ノート: 1996–1999 = Kokubyaku nōto: 1996–1999 = Black & white note: 1996–1999. Osaka: Vacuum, 2010. ISBN 9784990328856. Vacuum Press 5. Black and white photographs; no captions or other text. (Note: The publisher's page about Black & white note (as archived by the Wayback Machine on 8 September 2014) is here.)
- マニラ: August, 1983 = Manira: August, 1983 = Manila: August, 1983. Osaka: Vacuum, 2011. ISBN 9784990328887. Vacuum Press 7. Black and white photographs; no captions or other text. (Note: The publisher's page about Manila (as archived by the Wayback Machine on 8 September 2014) is here.)
- 黒白ノート・2 = Kokubyaku nōto: 2 = Black & white note 2. Osaka: Vacuum, 2012. OCLC 827210141. Vacuum Press 9. Black and white photographs; no captions or other text. (Note: The publisher's page about Black & white note 2 (as archived by the Wayback Machine on 8 September 2014) is here.)
- 2001. Osaka: Vacuum, 2013. OCLC 870254914. Vacuum Press 11. Black and white photographs; no captions or other text. (Note: The publisher's page about 2001 (as archived by the Wayback Machine on 8 September 2014) is here.)
- Busan. Osaka: Vacuum, 2014. Black and white photographs. (Note: The publisher's page about Busan (as archived by the Wayback Machine on 3 April 2016) is here.)
- 1981＜上＞ = 1981 (jō) = 1981: Top. (Note: "Top" is a literal translation of jō (上) in other contexts; and "bottom" is a literal translation of ge (下) in other contexts. In this context, jō and ge simply mean volumes 1 and 2 respectively of a two-volume work. (As is common for two-volume works in Japan, the two are priced and sold separately.)) Osaka: Vacuum, 2015. Vacuum Press 14. First volume of a two-volume set. Black and white photographs. (Note: The publisher's page about 1981: Top (as archived by the Wayback Machine on 3 April 2016) is here.)
- 1981＜下＞ = 1981 (ge) = 1981: Bottom. Osaka: Vacuum, 2015. Vacuum Press 15. Second volume of a two-volume set. Black and white photographs. (Note: The publisher's page about 1981: Bottom (as archived by the Wayback Machine on 3 April 2016) is here.)
- 1981 コウベ = 1981 Kōbe = 1981: Kobe. Osaka: Vacuum, 2016.
- New York. Osaka: Vacuum, 2017. (Note: The publisher's page about New York is here.)
- Citizens in Society 1989~1994. Osaka: Vacuum, 2019. (Note: The publisher's page about Citizens in Society 1989~1994 is here.)

== Exhibitions ==
=== Solo exhibitions ===
- 2006: Black & White Note: Box, Gallery 10:06, Osaka.
- 2012: Citizens/1983, Gallery Niépce, Tokyo.
- 2012/2013: Citizens, The Third Gallery Aya, Osaka.
- 2013: Black & White Note, Black & White Note 2, Place M Photo Gallery, Tokyo. Related to his Society of Photography Award.

=== Group exhibitions ===
- 2011: Citizens, Quad Gallery, Format International Photography Festival, Derby, UK, 4 March–8 May 2011.
- 2013: Paris Photo, Grand Paris, Paris. Presented by The Third Gallery Aya, Osaka.
- 2013: Citizens, The Third Gallery Aya, Osaka. With Miyako Ishiuchi. Part of the exhibition Paris Photo 2013.
- 2014: FotoIstanbul, Istanbul, Turkey, 17 October – 18 November 2014.

== Awards ==
- 2013: Society of Photography Award (Shashin no Kai shō) from the Society of Photography.
