= Kiyoshi Suzuki =

Japanese photographer

Kiyoshi Suzuki (鈴木 清, Suzuki Kiyoshi; 1943–2000) was a Japanese photographer. He began photographing in the late 1960s in Iwaki, where he was born on 30 November 1943. He worked for thirty years in relative isolation. Suzuki's way of designing his photography books, layer upon layer upon layer, became central to his art.

== Solo exhibitions ==
- "Burāman no hikari" (ブラーマンの光) / "India". 1969.
- "Tenmaku no machi" (天幕の街) / "Mind Games". Ginza Nikon Salon (Tokyo), 1980.
- 路上の愚者浦崎哲雄への旅. 1983.
- "Gyōkan no nagame Gypsy wind Watakushi no 12-satsu" (行間の眺 gypsy wind 私の12冊). 1984.
- 茶昆の赤 長谷川利行東京放浪地図. 1985.
- 夢の走り 上海釜山ニ郷物語. 1985.
- 天地劇場. 1987.
- "Nagare no uta" (流れの歌) / "Sunday Picture". 1989.
- "Fool's paradise (Tōkyō, Shōwa 61–63nen)" (Fool's paradise (東京・昭和61～63年). Shinjuku Nikon Salon (Tokyo), 1989.
- 光の暴減. 1991.
- "Kota Jakaruta" (コタ・ジャカルタ) / "Southern Breeze". 1990s.
- 母の溟 / "From the Border." Ginza Nikon Salon (Tokyo), 1992. (Twice, the second time in celebration of winning the Ina Nobuo Award.)
- "Nagare no uta yori" (流れの歌より) / "Soul and Soul". 1990s.
- 修羅の圏. Ginza Nikon Salon (Tokyo), 1995.
- "Handoreddo suteppu 1967–95" (ハンドレッド・ステップ 1967–95). Ginza Nikon Salon (Tokyo), 1995.
- "Dyurasu no ryōdo" (デュラスの領土). 1996–98.
- "Kiyoshi Suzuki: Soul and Soul, 1969–1999". Noorderlicht Photogallery (Groningen), March–May 2008.

== Books by Suzuki ==
- Nagare no uta: Suzuki Kiyoshi shashinshū (流れの歌 鈴木清写真集) / Soul and Soul. [Yokohama]: [Kiyoshi Suzuki], 1972. (in Japanese) Captions (including place and year) in Japanese only.
  - Facsimile edition. Tokyo: Hakusuisha, 2010. ISBN 978-4-560-08100-6. Additional endpapers and dust cover, and a 12-page pamphlet with a commentary by Kōtarō Iizawa and a chronology in both Japanese and English.
- Burāman no hikari: Suzuki Kiyoshi shashinshū (ブラーマンの光 鈴木清写真集). Yokohama: Sansara, 1976. Photographs of India. (in Japanese and English) Captions (placenames) in Roman script only, a short essay in both Japanese and English.
- Tenmaku no machi (天幕の街) / Mind Games. Yokohama: 遊幻舎, 1982.
- Yume no hashiri 1982–1987 (夢の走り: 1982-1987) / Street Shuffle. Yokohama: Ocean Books, 1988.
- Nikutai no jidai: Taikenteki '60 nendai bunkaron (肉体の時代―体験的'60年代文化論). Tokyo: Gendai Shokan, 1989. Text by Kōshi Ueno (上野昂志, Ueno Kōshi); photographs by Suzuki.
- Gusha no fune: Tōkyō Shōwa 61–63: Suzuki Kiyoshi shashinshū (愚者の船: 東京・昭和61-63年 鈴木清写真集) / The Ship of Fools. Tokyo: IBC, 1991. ISBN 4-87198-843-0.
- Tenchi gijō (天地戯場: 鈴木清写真集 1990←92 2) / Kiyoshi Suzuki Photographs 1990–92. Yokohama: Taman Saribukkusu, 1992.
- Shūra no tani 修羅の圏: 自伝 鈴木清 7 / Finish Dying. Yokohama: Deku Bukkusu, 1994.
- Dyurasu no ryōdo: Marugeritto Dyurasu no Ajia (デュラスの領土: マルグリット・デュラスのアジア) / Durasia. Yokohama: G. Sāguru, 1998.
- Soul and Soul 1969–1999. Groningen: Aurora Borealis, 2008. ISBN 978-90-76703-35-0. A reprint of Suzuki's extensively marked up dummy of the 1972 book.
