= Kensuke Kazama =

Japanese photographer

Yubari, the work that won Kazama the Society of Photography Award and the PSJ newcomer's award in 2006.

Kensuke Kazama (風間 健介, Kazama Kensuke; 18 September 1960 – June 2017) was a Japanese photographer who photographed the one-time mining town of Yūbari, Hokkaidō.

Born in Mie Prefecture, Kazama moved to Tokyo in 1978. He held exhibitions in Tokyo two years later. In 1987 he moved to Nanporo in Hokkaidō, and two years later to Yūbari. He lived there for 18 years.

Kazama's photographs of the town of Yūbari and its abandoned mines and mining paraphernalia are in black and white, and employ a medium-format camera for detail and small aperture for great depth of field, often allied with a formal composition. Mitsugu Ōnishi points out that the results "run counter to the ruins photography trend". From 1994 his photographs of Yūbari appeared in the magazines Nippon Camera and Asahi Camera; he also participated regularly in Higashikawa Photofesta.

Kazama won the 18th Higashikawa Special Prize in 2002 and (for his book Yūbari) the PSJ newcomer's award and the 18th Society of Photography Award in 2006.

In March 2006, Kazama moved to Mitaka, Tokyo. His subsequent photographs of nearby Inokashira Park, which employ the same techniques as his photographs of Yūbari, have been published. He would sell his prints for as little as 1,000 yen each.

Kazama later moved to Sayama (Saitama), where in 2010 he was working more with photograms, mounting both food specimens and potato crisps lightly edited to resemble faces in a specially constructed negative carrier and enlarging from this.

In 2014 Kazama finally moved to Tateyama (Chiba), where he continued his photography.

Kazama had great trouble making a living. Despite complaining about ill-health, he would not go to a hospital. He posted his final comment on Facebook on 3 June 2017; his body was discovered at home on 17 June.

== Books by Kazama ==
- Live. Self-published, 1980.
- Sorachi tankō isan sanpo (そらち炭鉱遺産散歩, Walks in the remains of the coalmines of Sorachi). Sapporo: Kyōdō Bunkasha, 2003. ISBN 4-87739-088-X. Kazama contributes the photographs.
- Kazama Kensuke shashinshū: Yūbari (風間健介写真集：夕張) / Kensuke Kazama Photographic Collection: Yubari. Sapporo: Jyuryousya, 2005. ISBN 4-902269-14-7. All text and captions in both Japanese and English.

== Sources and external links ==
- Kazama's site
- (in Japanese) a site about Kazama
- "Minna shashin yaranaika," a fan's page about Kazama
