= Shunji Dodo =

Japanese photographer

Shunji Dodo (百々 俊二, Dodo Shunji) is a Japanese photographer of the Kii Peninsula, Osaka, and other subjects.

== Life and career ==
Dodo was born in Osaka in 1947. He graduated in fine arts from Kyushu Sangyo University in 1970, and started teaching at Tōkyō Shashin Senmon Gakkō (now Visual Arts College Tokyo). Two years later he started work as a teacher of photography at Ōsaka Shashin Senmon Gakkō; in 1998 he was made head of the school, by that time renamed Visual Arts College Osaka.

Dodo was present when the film director Naomi Kawase, who had first been a student of his and was later teaching at Visual Arts Senmon Gakkō, had her first baby on 24 April 2004, in Nara. This was filmed as Tarachime (垂乳女) and Dodo photographed the event; the photographs were exhibited in Nara, Tokyo, and Locarno, and published as Haha (花母).

Dodo's book of large-format black-and-white photographs A Radiant Land: Kii Peninsula won the PSJ's Annual Award for 1995; his later collection of large-format colour photographs of the peninsula, A Radiant Land with Thousands of Years, was exhibited in Nara City Museum of Photography in 2000. The latter work also won him the Ina Nobuo Award in 1999.

Dodo has said that his major influences were Shōmei Tōmatsu, especially his Ryūkyū series "Pencil of the Sun", and Yutaka Takanashi, for the way in which Takanashi's concentration on Tokyo showed Dodo his own possibilities in Osaka. Among the photographers he admires are Robert Frank and William Klein.

== Awards ==
- Ina Nobuo Award, 1999.
- Hidano Kazuemon Award (Higashikawa Awards), 2011.

== Exhibitions by Dodo ==
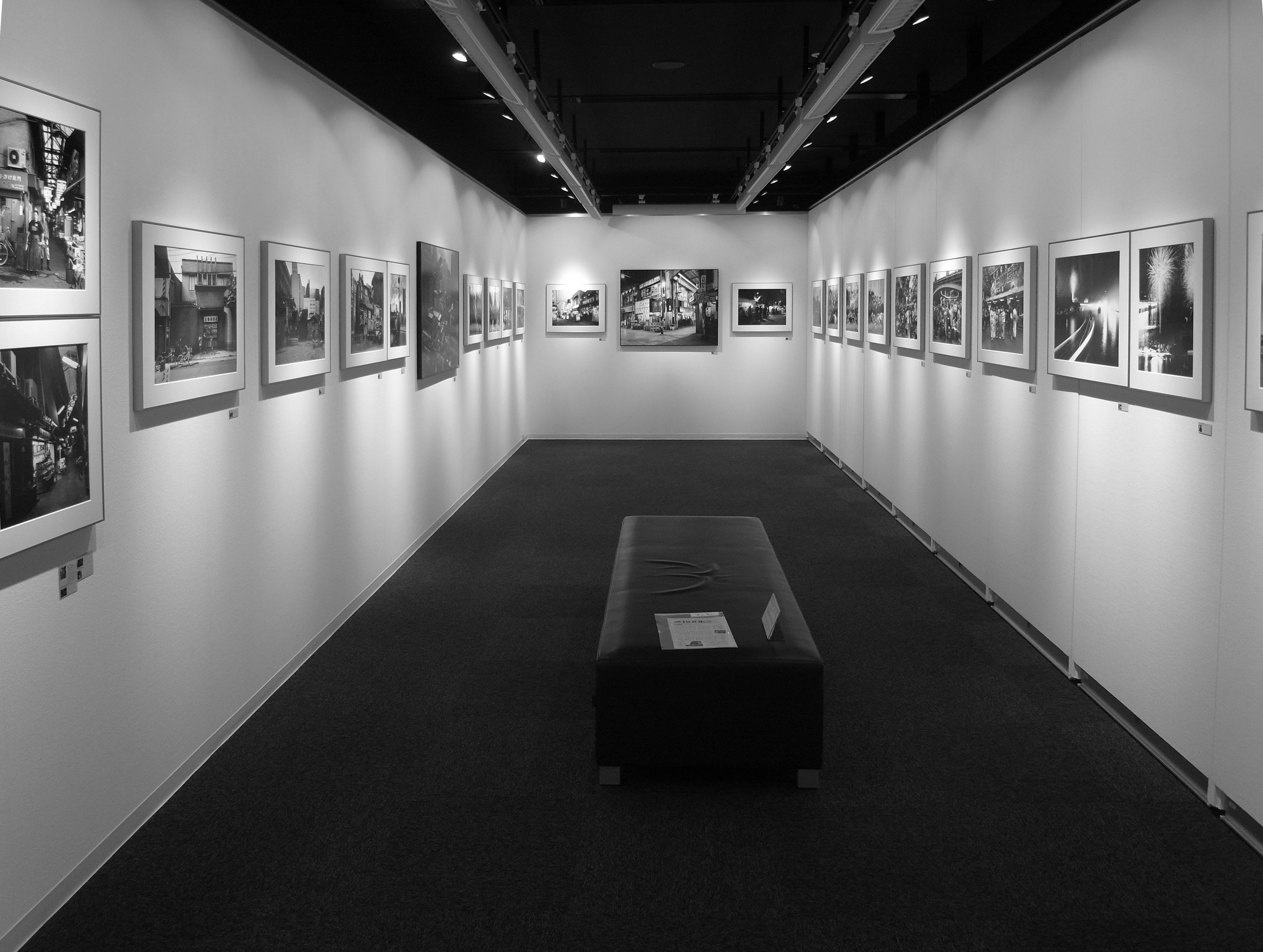
"Osaka" exhibition in the Osaka Nikon Salon, December 2011

- 1978 "Ōsaka, Tennōji". Nikon Salon (Ginza, Osaka).
- 1985 "Shinsekai: Mukashi mo ima mo". Nikon Salon (Ginza, Osaka).
- 1992 "Shujō yūraku, Bankoku". Nikon Salon (Ginza, Osaka).
- 1995–96 "Rakudo Kii hantō". Konica Plaza (Shinjuku, Osaka, Sapporo).
- 1999 "Sennen rakudo". Nikon Salon (Ginza, Osaka).
- 2000 "Sennen rakudo Kii hantō". Nara City Museum of Photography.
- 2002 ".com New York". Nikon Salon (Shinjuku).
- 2004 "Sharasōju". Visual Arts Gallery.
- 2006 "Haha". Gallery Out of Place (Nara).
- 2007 "Ha ha". Galerie Focale (Nyon).
- 2007 "Haha + vegetable". Gallery Bauhaus (Tokyo).
- 2007 "Ha ha". Focale Galerie (Locarno).
- 2010 "Osaka". Nikon Salon (Ginza and Osaka).
- 2010 "Kamagasaki/Shinsekai: Life in the shadow of the economic miracle". Zen Foto Gallery (Shibuya, Tokyo). Photographs of Shinsekai and Kamagasaki (both in Osaka) by Dodo and Seiryū Inoue.
- 2010 "Osaka". Tokio Out of Place (Minami Azabu, Tokyo).

== Film, video ==
- Coproducer, The Mourning Forest (2007).
- Actor, Tsunagari-yuku mono (つながりゆくもの) / Things Passed Down (dir. Naomi Kawase, 2009). Dodo plays the gruff photographer father in this long commercial for Nikon.

== Publications by Dodo ==
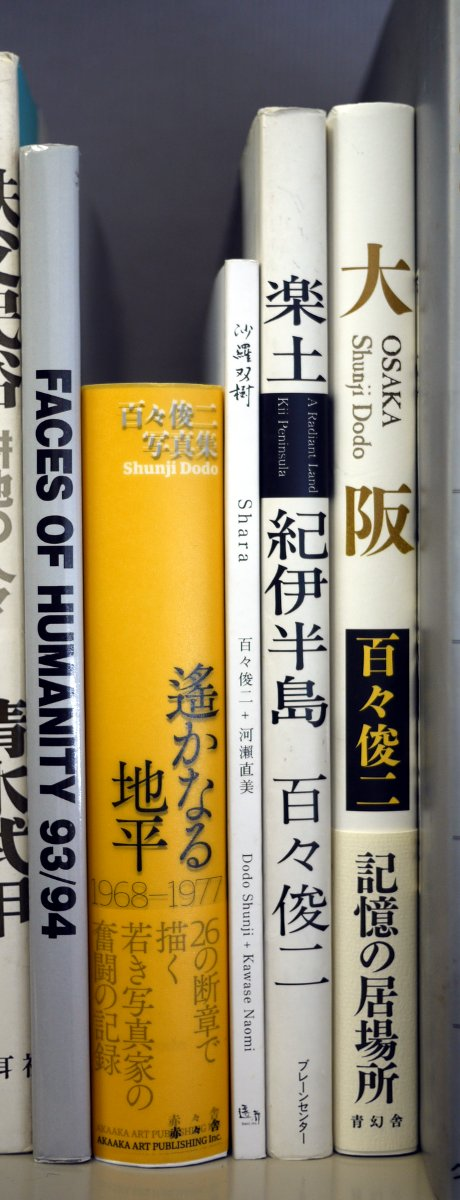
Some photobooks by Shunji Dodo

- Chihei (地平) / Horizon. Issues 1–10. 1971–77.
- Shinsekai: Mukashi mo ima mo (新世界 むかしも今も). Osaka: Chōseisha, 1986. Black-and-white photographs of Shinsekai, Osaka. (in Japanese)
- Horizon, 1993. A joint work.
- Shashin "Ningen no machi" 93/94 (写真[人間の街]93/94) / Faces of Humanity 93/94. Edited by Shunji Dodo, George Hashiguchi, and Naomi Yanagimoto. Published by the editors (at their respective addresses), 1994. (in Japanese and English) Much of the text is in English as well as Japanese. On pp. 156–65 Dodo presents his own series, "Kaosu 1969–1970" (カオス 1969・1970), photographs of people from US military bases and of protests against these.
- Rakudo: Kii hantō (楽土 紀伊半島) / A Radiant Land: Kii Peninsula. Osaka: Brain Center, 1995. ISBN 4-8339-0525-6. Large-format black-and-white photographs of the Kii Peninsula. (in Japanese and English)
- Sennen rakudo (千年楽土) / A Radiant Land with Thousands of Years. Osaka: Brain Center, 2000. ISBN 4-8339-0530-2. Large-format colour photographs of the Kii Peninsula. (in Japanese and English)
- Sharasōju (沙羅双樹) / Shara. Nara: Sento/Kumie, 2003. With Naomi Kawase; black-and-white photographs of the making of, and production notes for, Kawase's film Shara. (in Japanese and English)
- Haha (花母). Nara: Gallery Out of Place, 2006.
- Saien + sakura (菜園＋サクラ) / A Vegetable Garden, Sakura. Osaka: Vacuum Press, 2009. ISBN 978-4-9903288-4-9. Black-and-white photographs of the products of Dodo's vegetable garden, and of cherry blossoms. (in Japanese and English)
- Ōsaka (大阪 / Osaka. Kyoto: Seigensha, 2010. ISBN 978-4-86152-255-0. Large-format black-and-white photographs of Osaka. (in Japanese and English)
- Haruka na chihei (遙かなる地平 / Horizon far and away 1968–1977. Tokyo: Akaakasha, 2012. ISBN 978-4-903545-87-5. Numerous series of Dodo's older photographs. (in Japanese and English)
- Nihonkai (日本海 / Japan Sea. Tokyo: Akaakasha, 2014. ISBN 978-4-86541019-8. Photographs of the Sea of Japan coastal area. (in Japanese and English)
- Sorahoderi no machi (空火照の街 / A City Aglow. Tokyo: Case, 2019. ISBN 978-4-908526-37-4. (in Japanese and English)
