= Seiichi Motohashi =

Japanese photographer and film director (1940–2025)

Seiichi Motohashi (本橋 成一, Motohashi Seiichi; 1940 – December 20, 2025) was a Japanese photographer and film director. He died on December 20, 2025, at the age of 85.

== Awards ==
- 1968: The 5th Taiyousho Award for The Coal Mine
- 1995: The Photographic Society of Japan Annual Award and the Society of Photography Award for Infinite Embrace
- 1998: The 17th Domon Ken Award for Nadya’s Village
- 1998: The 8th Excellent Film Award of the Agency for Cultural Affairs for Documentary film Nadya’s Village
- 2002: The Readers’ Prize of the Berliner Zeitung and the International Cine Club Prize at the 52nd Berlin International Film Festival for Documentary film Alexei and the Spring
- 2013: The Photographic Society of Japan Award for Slaughterhouse and Ueno Station (revised edition)

== Exhibitions (selected) ==
- 2002: Nadezhda - Hope The Tokyo Metropolitan Museum of Photography.
- 2016: Sense of Place The Izu Photo Museum, Shizuoka Prefecture.

== Publications (selected) ==
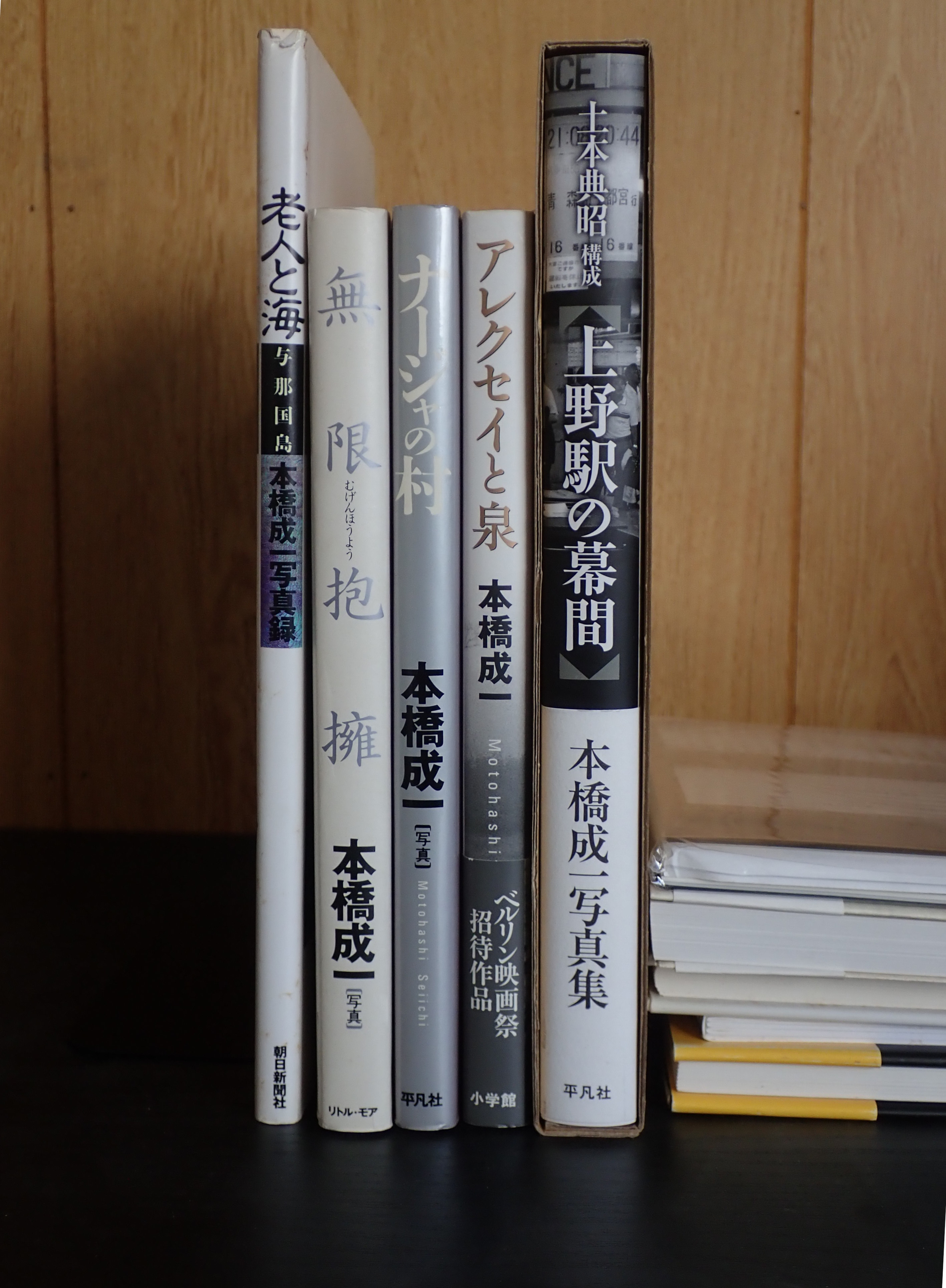
A few of the books by Motohashi

- The Coal Mine (Kaichosha)
- Circus Time (Kawade Shobo Shinsha)
- Ueno Station (Heibonsha)
- Infinite Embrace (Nishida Shoten)
- Nadya’s Village (Touseisha)
- Alexei and the Spring (Shogakukan)
- A Thousand Year Song of Baobab (Heibonsha)
- Performance East and West (Office emu)
- Slaugherhouse (Heibonsha)
- People on the Seikan Ferryboat (Tsugaru Shobo)
- Sense of Place (Nohara)
- Tsukiji Fish Market – A People’s Town (Asahi Shimbun Publications Inc.)

== Sources ==
- Nihon shashinka jiten (日本写真家事典) / 328 Outstanding Japanese Photographers. Kyoto: Tankōsha, 2000. ISBN 4-473-01750-8. (in Japanese) Despite the English-language alternative title, all in Japanese.
