= Miyako Ishiuchi =

Japanese photographer (born 1947)

- Born: March 27, 1947 (age 79); Nitta District, Gunma
- Known for: Photography
- Awards: Kimura Ihei Award 1979; Domestic Photographer Prize – Higashikawa Prize 1999; Society of Photography Award – Pictures of the Year International 1999; Hasselblad Award 2014

Miyako Ishiuchi (石内 都, Ishiuchi Miyako; born March 27, 1947), is a Japanese photographer.

In 2005, she represented Japan at the Venice Biennale. In March 2014, she received the Hasselblad Foundation International Award in Photography.

Ishiuchi's work is included in the collections of the Museum of Modern Art, New York, The J. Paul Getty Museum, Los Angeles, the San Francisco Museum of Modern Art, San Francisco, and the Art Institute of Chicago.

== Life and work ==
Ishiuchi was born March 27, 1947, in Nitta District, Gunma, Japan, and raised in Yokosuka, Kanagawa. She graduated from Yokosuka City Public High school and was admitted to the design department at Tama Art University, where she specialized in textile dying and weaving. She left the department in her second year.

Ishiuchi grew up in Kiryu and Yokosuka, home to the largest naval base in the East. There, she remained until she was 19. "The scars of adolescence that I sustained there had a big effect on me, and you could say that Yokosuka was the starting point for my photography," the artist tells Ocula Magazine in 2021.

Ishiuchi began photographing when her friend left their darkroom equipment with her family and she got a chance to use the equipment. She ran within the same circle as photographers Daido Moriyama and Shomei Tomatsu, who latter praised her work highly at her first exhibition. These photographers were dealing with postwar trauma while also exploring new directions in photography for the new, postwar era.

Ishiuchi has produced full collections of photography since the late 1970s. Her first photo series was a study of Yokosuka, Yokosuka Stories (1976–1977), documenting the city where she grew up. While working with them, Ishiuchi organized the all-women photography exhibition Hyakka Ryoran at the Shimizu Gallery in 1976. In 1979, she won the Kimura Ihei Award for her photoalbum APARTMENT and her photography exhibition Apaato.

Her work favors the oversize grainy prints and gritty subject matter that characterize the pictures of many photographers in the late 1960s and 1970s who preferred the are-bure, or grainy-blurry. She began to take close-ups of the bodies of the very old in the early 1990s. More recently, her photographs have addressed themes of skin, clothing, and time. In Hiroshima (2008), she photographed the clothes of victims from the atomic bombing of Hiroshima. In Frida: Love and Pain (2012), she was invited by the Frida Kahlo Museum in Mexico City to photograph Frida Kahlo's personal artifacts, including corsets, clothing, shoes, rings, combs and other accessories, makeup, and medicines. In 2022, she held her first show in Scotland at Edinburgh's Stills studio. The exhibition showed selected photographs from her previous series Mother's, Hiroshima and Frida.

== Exhibitions ==
=== Selected Solo exhibitions ===
- Ishiuchi Miyako: Postwar Shadows, Getty Center, Los Angeles, CA, October 2015 – February 2016. A retrospective.
- Grain and Shadow, Yokohama Museum of Art, Yokohama, Japan, December 2017 – March 2018. A retrospective.
- Ishiuchi Miyako, Stills, Edinburgh, Scotland, July 2022 – October 2022.

=== Selected Group exhibitions ===
- 1994: Japanese Art After 1945: Scream Against the Sky, Guggenheim Museum, New York
- 2005: Venice Biennale
- 2016–2017: Japanese Photography from Postwar to Now, San Francisco Museum of Modern Art, San Francisco
- Traveling exhibition: I’m So Happy You Are Here: Japanese Women Photographers from the 1950s to Now, Aperture
  - Rencontres d’Arles, July 1 – September 29, 2024
  - Fotomuseum Den Haag, The Hague, Netherlands, January 18 – May 5, 2025
  - FFF Frankfurt, Germany, May 24 – September 7, 2025
  - The Photographers’ Gallery, June 24 – September 27, 2026
  - Hikarie Hall, Tokyo (Organized by Bunkamura) July 4 – August 26, 2026
  - International Center of Photography October 15, 2026 – January 11, 2027
- 2026: A Long Shadow: Postwar Japan Through the Lens, The Metropolitan Museum of Art, New York

== Awards ==
- 1979: Kimura Ihei Award
- 1999: Higashikawa Prize, Domestic Photographer Prize
- 1999: Society of Photography Award
- 2006: Photographic Society of Japan
- 2009: Mainichi Art Award
- 2013: Medal of Honor, Purple Ribbon
- 2014: Hasselblad Award, Hasselblad Foundation

== Collections ==
Ishiuchi's work is held in the following public collections:

- Museum of Modern Art, New York
- J. Paul Getty Museum, Los Angeles
- San Francisco Museum of Modern Art
