= Seiichi Furuya =

- Born: 1950 (age 75–76); Izu, Japan
- Spouse: Christine Furuya-Gössler (m.1978–1985)
- Children: Komyo-Klaus Furuya
- Website: https://www.furuya.at/en/home.html

Seiichi Furuya (古屋 誠一, Furuya Seiichi; born 1950) is a Japanese photographer, based in Graz, Austria. He is known for his intimate, diaristic photographs of his late wife, Christine Furuya-Gössler, as well as his photographic work documenting borders and life in East Germany. Furuya is a co-founder of the photography magazine and institution Camera Austria.

== Biography ==
=== Early life and education ===
Furuya was born in Izu, Japan. Furuya studied architecture and then photography at the Tokyo Polytechnic University. He took pictures of protests taking place in the turbulent postwar Japan, documenting university riots and anti-war movements in Tokyo. Eventually, Furuya decided to leave his homeland, burning all his negatives from his life in Japan.

=== Life and career in Austria ===
In September 1973, Furuya traveled to Vienna via the Trans-Siberian Railway. Two years later, Furuya moved to Graz at the invitation of a friend to work at a camera shop. It was there that he began connecting with other photographers and became an active member of the artist cooperative Forum Stadtpark. In February 1978 at an opening at Forum Stadtpark, Furuya met Christine Gössler (1953–1985), an art history student at the time. They began a relationship, and Furuya described himself and Christine as "inseparable" from their first date. The two married the same year in May, in Furuya's hometown of Izu, Japan. Christine gave birth to their son, Komyo-Klaus, in April 1981. Although she had been working for the Austrian broadcasting network ORF, Christine had long desired to become an actress and the family moved to Vienna in 1982 so she could study drama.

=== East Germany ===
After struggling to make ends meet, the family relocated to Dresden, East Germany in 1984, where Furuya received work as an interpreter for a Japanese construction firm. They moved again the next year, to East Berlin. Christine battled with depression during this period and spent time in and out of hospitalization for schizophrenia. On October 7, 1985, the 36th anniversary of the founding of the German Democratic Republic, Christine died by suicide after jumping out the window of their East Berlin apartment.

=== Late career ===
After completing his work as an interpreter in East Berlin, Furuya returned to Graz in 1987. In 1989, Furuya held a solo exhibition at the Neue Galerie Graz, Mémoires, accompanied by a publication of the same title. Initially conceived as a way to commemorate Christine and process her death, the project evolved through four subsequent versions, each revisiting his photographic archive.

At a solo exhibition of his work at the Tokyo Metropolitan Museum of Photography in 2010, Furuya announced that the fifth volume would be the final installment in the series. Following a stroke that year, he withdrew from photography for several years to focus on his recovery. He has continued to exhibit of his work internationally, and has published more than a dozen photobooks.

== Photographic work ==
=== Christine Furuya-Gössler and Mémoires ===
Christine Furuya-Gössler became a central subject of Furuya's images following their meeting in 1978. Describing his feelings for her, Furuya wrote in a passage in Camera Austria International:

From the first day I began taking photographs of her regularly. I have seen in her a woman who passes me by, sometimes a model, sometimes the woman I love, sometimes the woman who belongs to me. I feel it is my duty to continue to photograph the woman who holds so many meanings for me. When I consider that taking photographs means fixing time and space, then this work—the documenting of the life of one human being—is exceptionally thrilling for me. In facing her, in photographing her, and looking at her in photographs, I also see and discover “myself."

Furuya developed a long-term photo series, dedicated to the memory of Christine, including the publication of five photobooks: Memories (Edition Camera Austria,1989); Seiichi Furuya, Mémoires 1995 (Scalo Books,1995); Christine Furuya-Gössler Mémoires, 1978–1985 (Korinsha Press, 1997); Memories 1983 (Akaaka Art Publishing, 2006); and Mémoires. 1984–1987 (Nohara, 2010).

=== Staatsgrenze/Border ===
From 1981 to 1983, Furuya worked on a project titled Staatsgrenze, documenting the border landscape between Austria and its neighbors, Yugoslavia, Hungary, and Czechoslovakia. The series depicts everyday scenes of life occurring along these national boundaries and was later published as a book in 2014, coinciding with the 25th anniversary of the fall of the Iron Curtain.

== Camera Austria ==
In 1980, Furuya co-founded the institution Camera Austria, alongside photographers Manfred Willmann and Christine Frisinghelli, in Graz. The association encompasses a discussion-platform, exhibition space, publishing house, public archive and library, as well as publishes the journal Camera Austria International Magazine. Furuya was an early recipient of the Camera Austria Award, a biannually granted accolade for commendable achievements in the field of contemporary photography.

== Selected solo exhibitions ==
- 2010: Mémoires., Tokyo Photographic Art Museum, Tokyo, Japan
- 2011: Seiichi Furuya – Mémoires, Galerie Thomas Fischer, Berlin Germany
- 2026/27: Seiichi Furuya: Mémoires, Camera Austria, Graz, Austria

== Selected collections ==
Seiichi Furuya's work is held in the public art collections around the world, including:

- Albertina, Vienna, Austria
- Centre Pompidou, Paris, France
- Metropolitan Museum of Art, New York, NY
- Museum of Modern Art, New York, NY
- San Francisco Museum of Modern Art, San Francisco, CA
- Stedelijk Museum Amsterdam, The Netherlands
- Tokyo Photographic Art Museum, Tokyo, Japan
