= Nikon Salon =

Exhibition spaces and activities run by Nikon in Japan

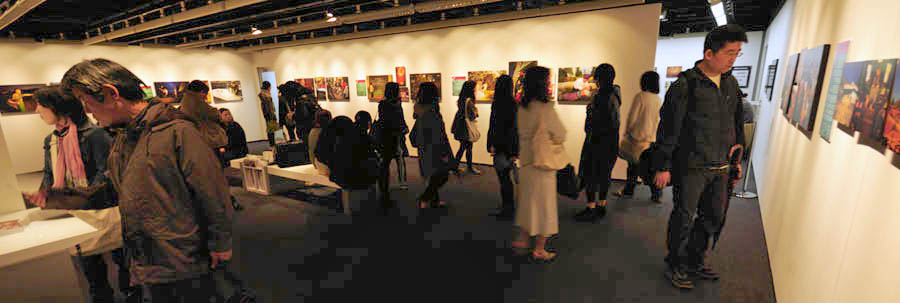
The Shinjuku Nikon Salon in Tokyo

Nikon Salon (ニコンサロン, Nikon saron) is the name given to exhibition spaces and activities run by Nikon in Japan.

The Ginza Nikon Salon (in Ginza, Tokyo) opened in January 1968 (with an exhibition of work by Ihei Kimura) to celebrate the 50th anniversary of Nippon Kōgaku (later renamed Nikon). This was later augmented by the Shinjuku Nikon Salon (Shinjuku, Tokyo) and the Osaka Nikon Salon (Umeda, Osaka). Nikon Salon also holds a biannual international photography contest, gives free portfolio reviews and gives awards for the best exhibitions at the Nikon Salons: the Ina Nobuo Award, the Miki Jun Award and two Miki Jun Inspiration Awards every December. All of the Nikon Salon's activities are open to photographers who could use any camera gear.

== Miki Jun Awards ==
Miki Jun Award is an annual award given by Nikon for the best photo show at the Nikon Salon by an artist under 35 years old. It was established in 1999 by the Selection Committee of the Nikon Salon and is named after the documentary photographer Miki Jun, who was the first Japanese photographer to publish in Life Magazine. Nikon added 2 annual Miki Jun Inspiration Awards (三木淳賞奨励賞) in 2003. These awards are given to the most creative and remarkable work exhibited during Nikon Salon Juna21's annual calendar based not just on a single photo but an entire exhibition, including the title, introduction, all of the photos, captions, sequencing, and printing. The prize consists of the "Infinity" trophy, by Asahiko Yamada; ¥300,000; and a Nikon D300s with zoom lens. Winners may also hold an exhibition of new work at the Nikon Salon in Ginza within two years of certification. The prizes for the Miki Jun Inspiration Award consists of a certificate, ¥100,000, and a Nikon D7000 with 18-200mm VRII zoom lens.
