= Ken Domon =

Japanese photographer (1909–1990)

- 土門 拳
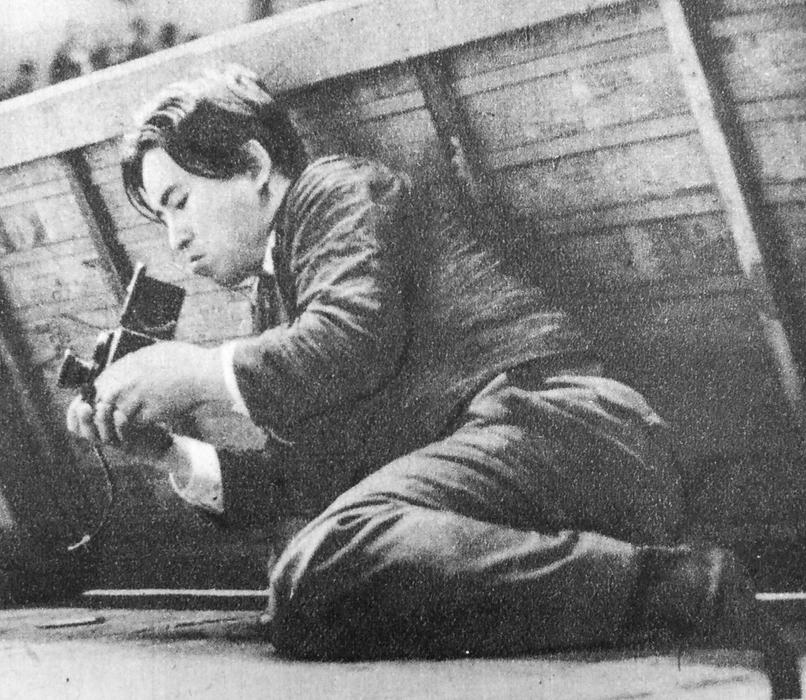
- Domon in 1948
- Born: Domon Ken (土門 拳); 25 October 1909; Sakata, Yamagata Prefecture, Japan
- Died: 15 September 1990 (aged 80); Tokyo, Japan
- Education: Kotaro Miyauchi Photo Studio
- Known for: Photography
- Awards: Mainichi Photography Award (1958); Japan Photo Critics Association Photographer of the Year Award (1958); Award of Arts (1959); Japan Journalist's Congress Award (1960)

Ken Domon (土門 拳, Domon Ken; 25 October 1909 – 15 September 1990) was a celebrated Japanese photographer known for his work as a photojournalist and as a photographer of Buddhist temples and statuary.

Domon, who began his career in the 1930s contributing photo reportages to magazines that supported the increasingly militaristic Japanese state and its imperial policies, later criticized propaganda photography. His subsequent termination from the government agency he worked for spurred his career as a freelance photographer.

As photojournalists grappled with how to depict the new social reality of the post-WWII period, Domon forged the realistic photography movement (Riarizumu Shashin Undō). He embraced the idea of snapshot photography (sunappu), in which images could be captured with "absolute unstagedness". Domon documented the aftermath of the war, focusing on society and the lives of ordinary people. He received national acclaim for his portraits of children in exploitative labor conditions and Hiroshima bomb survivors (hibakusha).

Domon was forced to abandon sunappu photography after he suffered a debilitating stroke in 1958. His major project until the end of his career was photographing temples across Japan, a much-beloved subject that he had first begun to document in 1940. These images constituted the monumental series Pilgrimage to Ancient Temples (Koji Junrei), published in five volumes from 1963 to 1975.

== Biography ==
=== Early life and career beginnings ===
Domon was born to a working-class family in Sakata, Yamagata Prefecture. After his father lost his job, Domon had to abandon his studies and begin working in a furniture shop. As a young man, Domon was passionate about painting, and exhibited an oil painting at the Yokohama annual art exhibition in 1926. However, fearing career instability, he decided not to pursue his interest professionally. Domon was eventually able to finish his studies in 1928 despite his family's financial difficulties.

In 1929, Domon began taking courses in law at Nihon University. He continued to paint in his free time and took shamisen lessons. In 1932, Domon was expelled from Nihon University for his involvement as a secretary at the Agricultural Workers' League (Nōmin kumiai), associated with the Japanese Communist Party. He was arrested by the police and only released upon promising to break all ties with communism.

Domon's mother advised him to join the photo studio of Miyauchi Kōtarō as an apprentice in 1933. His entry into the photographic scene coincided with the flourishing of the medium in Japan in the late 1920s and early 1930s: photographic journals like Photo Times and Kōga allowed the Japanese public to view images produced by European avant-garde photographers. The exhibition Film und Foto, first held in 1929 in Stuttgart, subsequently traveling to Tokyo and Osaka in 1931, was equally instrumental in energizing Japanese photographers. Additionally, the newly available Leica, a small and affordable camera, allowed amateurs to begin taking photographs, which encouraged the development of new photography groups. Domon familiarized himself rapidly with the medium thanks to his voracious consumption of lectures from hundreds of photography books and magazines.

=== Early career, 1933-1939 ===
From the outset of his career, Domon expressed an interest in photography with social and cultural themes. After publishing his first photo in the magazine Asahi Camera in 1935, he left his apprenticeship at Kōtarō's photo studio prematurely to work for Nippon Kōbō, an agency founded by photographer Yōnosuke Natori. From 1934 until the end of the Asia Pacific War, the agency published NIPPON, a photo magazine targeted at foreigners to promote Japanese culture abroad. Art historian Gennifer Weisenfeld notes that as such "it served as a quasi-governmental organ of national propaganda", receiving support from several state agencies.

Domon has stated that he lacked confidence and technical skill working on his first assignments, but he soon developed his craft and with it his self-assurance. Tension between the young photographer and his superior Natori soon set in. The work of the Nippon Kōbō photographers was considered a "company product" and thus was credited only to Natori, to Domon's chagrin.

His first reportage for NIPPON, published in 1936 and taken with his Leica, covered the Shichi-go-san festival at the Meiji Jingu shrine in Tokyo. He then completed several shoots highlighting Japanese artisans and traditions. These early black and white photographs are often artfully composed, with dynamic lines and forms.

In 1938, with the support of Photo Times, he helped found the Youth Reportage Photography Research Association (Seinen Hōdō Shashin Kenkyūkai), in which Hiroshi Hamaya also participated.

Photojournalism began to transform in the mid-1930s as Japan became increasingly nationalistic in the wake of the imperial expansion, eventually leading to the second Sino-Japanese war and the country's participation in World War II. Domon's pictures consequently became military-focused, depicting subjects such as Red Cross nurses and soldiers in training. His compositions rely on tightly organized groupings that convey collective order and strict discipline.

The tension between Natori and Domon continued to grow as Domon developed his ideas on photography and began publishing his photos in other magazines. Natori believed photography to be at the service of mass media, whereas Domon believed that the medium was a form of artistic expression. In 1939, Domon left Nippon Kōbō after being recruited to work for the Agency for International Cultural Relations (Kokusai Bunka Shinkōkai, "KBS"), a national propaganda organization. Curator Mari Shirayama posits that Natori played a role in instigating his recruitment, understanding that he could no longer collaborate professionally with Domon. At the KBS, Domon notably contributed to a series of large photography panels that promoted Japan at the International Exhibition at the World's Fair in San Francisco. During this time, Domon also played a central role in the Japanese Society of Reportage Photographers (Nippon Hōdō Shashin-ka Kyōkai).

=== War years, 1939-1945 ===
The intensifying war effort brought about major changes for Japanese photographers. Following the end of free publication, many magazines were forced to cease their operations. Consequently, opportunities for commissions grew scarce. Now married to his wife Tami, whom he met in 1939, Domon struggled to financially support their growing family. He also lived in fear of being sent to the warfront as a photojournalist.

Withdrawing temporarily from the tense wartime climate, Domon visited the remote Buddhist temple Murō-ji in Nara Prefecture in 1939, accompanied by his friend and art historian Sumio Mizusawa. He returned forty times that same year and would return frequently over the course of the following decade, irrefutably drawn to "the apparent immutability of the majestic nature of this little temple". He began taking photos in 1940 of its architecture and wooden Buddha statues (kōninbutsu), using a wooden portrait camera made by Konishiroku (now Konica). He also gradually got to know the villagers and the war-related tragedies they lived through. Murō-ji would be the catalyst for Domon's life-long work, Pilgrimage to Ancient Temples (Koji Junrei).

Domon's other significant wartime endeavor was a series on bunraku, a traditional form of Japanese puppet theater, which he began in 1941. Working with the puppeteers and the dark setting of the theater proved to be challenging. Nonetheless, Domon, with the help of assistants, worked tirelessly, using a heavy, primitive camera that was difficult to operate. The project was also threatened by a lack of sufficient materials due to wartime rationing. However, by 1943, they had produced 7,000 negatives. A selection of these images was published in the 1972 publication Bunraku.

Domon remained visible in the public sphere during the war, lecturing and writing about photography.In 1943, he published an article in the magazine Nihon Hyōron in which he announced his opposition to the use of magazines for propaganda, leading to the banning of the issue and his termination from KBS. Domon thus began forging his career as an independent freelance photographer.

Domon was to be drafted at the end of the war in 1945, but failed the required medical examination.

=== Post-war and Realism, 1945-1960 ===
The period following the Japanese defeat was a time of great societal unrest. Like many other photographers, Domon struggled to support himself. He made ends meet by developing film and printing photographs for G.I.s. As the publishing business gradually recovered, he was able to find jobs working for different photo magazines.

In 1950, Domon began work as a judge for the monthly photo contest organized by Camera magazine. He wrote short texts that accompanied the amateur photographs, and it was in these texts that the photographer began using "realism" (Riarizumu) to describe the photographs he admired.

By employing the term "realism", Domon built upon the first major debate in the Japanese art world during the post-war period. From 1946 to 1950, intellectuals and artists across disciplines tackled in heated discussions the question of what constituted "realism". Art historian Yuri Mitsuda importantly notes that "the realism debate was so divisive because it was not simply a matter of different formalistic preferences. The true topic being discussed was the attitude with which artists should confront reality and explore that reality through art."

Domon associated realism with the photographic "snapshot" (sunappu). He first encountered this notion at a round-table discussion with the ethnographer Kunio Yanagita in 1943. Yanagita argued that staged images had no scholarly value and advocated for the "snapshot": an image where no direction is given by the photographer. While at first Domon did not agree, he soon adopted this point of view. He believed that such photographs were the means to an objective depiction of society.

The artist's frequent writings and contributions to the discussion around sunappu and realism were not always coherent, therefore debates could be heated and confused. As Yoshiaki Kai aptly summarizes, "Domon's commentary on Riarizumu Photography gave the impression to the photographic community at that time that he was offering no more than an arbitrary definition of the word, and, even worse, taking advantage of this vaguely defined term to justify his own work and criticize that of others." Kai suggests that Domon's discourse was perhaps intentionally broad and vague as the artist continued to practice staged photography, like his well-known Portrait (Fūbo) series, depicting famous figures in literature, art, and cinema.

While Domon's discourse on realism could be occasionally unclear, his striking photographs powerfully and competently communicated the difficulties of daily life after the war. Among Domon's most powerful images are those of the survivors of the atomic bombing of Hiroshima and the life, in particular the children, of a poor coal-mining community in Chikuhō. Art historian Alexandra Munroe aptly describes these series: "Clinical, even dispassionate, Domon rejected deliberate artfulness to establish a legacy of evidence."

==== Hiroshima ====
In 1953, Domon published an essay condemning photographers who "diverted their eyes from current reality", explicitly evoking a photography exhibition organized by the Japan Photography Society (Nihon Shashinkai) that made no reference whatsoever to the war and its consequences.

Domon visited Hiroshima for the first time in 1957. He sought to capture the effects of the atomic bomb on its inhabitants, thirteen years after the attack. Domon published the images in a 1958 eponymous volume, which included 130 pages of photographs and 46 pages of notes by Domon. The photographs included viscerally shocking documentary images of surgeries and burned, wounded bodies, as well as images of rather cheerful everyday life of the patients at the Hiroshima Atomic Bomb Hospital.

Photography historian Frank Feltens states that the publication does not deal with the scars of Hiroshima objectively, "but in a highly emotional manner". Domon's foreword points to his compatriots' lack of interest for the victims, and he reminds the reader that the atomic bombings could have befallen any Japanese city. Feltens argues that Hiroshima "was largely intended as a victims' account for a domestic audience in order to create a form of national unity through collective victimization".

Domon's photographs brought light to Hiroshima victims' realities. Little information had been shared by the American occupying forces and the Japanese government about the attacks and their consequences. Indeed, it was only after the signing of the San Francisco peace treaty that photographs, writings and drawings testifying to the bombings could be published. A 1952 article in Asahi Graphic magazine, which included photos of the disaster, revealed for the first time to much of the Japanese public the extent of the bombs' aftermath. Even then, however, images of the nuclear aftermath were highly controlled. Famously the Japanese iterations of Edward Steichen's internationally renowned MoMA-sponsored photo exhibition Family of Man in 1956 and '57 did not include the mushroom cloud photograph featured prominently in the show's other venues, and the images of the aftermath in Nagasaki by Yōsuke Yamahata were censored after the opening of the show.

Despite the initial shock generated after its publication, Hiroshima received critical acclaim and remains a highly appreciated work of art for its humanist vision. Nobel prize laureate Kenzaburō Ōe wrote: "To depict living people who are fighting against the bomb, rather than the world of those who have died because of the bomb, is to face up head-on to the essence of art from an entirely human perspective."

=== Pilgrimage to ancient temples [Koji Junrei] and late career ===
Having nourished his interest for Buddhist temples since photographing Murō-ji, Domon continued to photograph temples throughout his career until he was finally no longer physically able. He photographed thirty-nine in total. While the images were originally intended to be printed in the periodical Camera Mainichi, Domon felt that this format did not suit the material. Instead, the photographs were printed in five rich volumes, published in 1963, 1965, 1968, 1971 and 1975. This also gave emphasis to Domon's new use of color film (Ektachrome E-1) from 1958 onwards.

Concerning his photographs of Japan's traditional culture, Domon wrote, "I am involved with the social realities of today, at the same time that I am involved with the traditions and classical culture of Nara and Kyoto, and these two involvements are linked by their common search for the point in which they are related to the fate of the people, the anger, the sadness, the joys of the Japanese people."

Domon's method of photographing these temples was to stay at the location for a time before taking the first photo. He would then begin photographing based not on a systematic, scholarly approach to the subject, but based on how his feelings towards the subjects moved him to record them. Domon prefaced the first volume of Koji Junrei with, "This is thus intended as a beloved book, a book which allows the individual Japanese to reconfirm the culture, the people which formed them."

Domon depended on the help of assistants to work on the series. He was incapacitated by a stroke in 1959 and after six months of rehabilitation, he had difficulties holding a camera correctly. He suffered a second stroke in 1968, resulting in the paralysis of his right side. He also had to use a wheelchair. Writing in 1977, the artist recounted how the use of his wheelchair changed his perspective, but that he was able to adjust "in a natural way".

The artist took his final photographs in March 1978. In 1979, he experienced a third stroke and fell into a coma, in which he remained until his death in 1990. He was eighty years old.

== Legacy ==
Domon received numerous prizes for his work throughout his career, including the Mainichi Photography Award and the Photographer of the Year Award from the Japan Photo Critics Association (Nihon shashin hihyōka kyōkai) for the collection Hiroshima.

A major mentor to younger photographers since the 1950s when he began judging photography competitions, he remains a major reference point for the Japanese photography world. Since 1981, the Mainichi Shinbun has awarded the Domon Ken award to a photographer for a published book of documentary photographs.

1983 marked the opening of the Ken Domon Museum of Photography (Domon Ken kinenkan) in Sakata, Yamagata, the artist's birthplace. Their collection holds about 70,000 prints of works by Domon, which he donated to the city after being named its first honorary citizen. It is the world's first museum dedicated to the work of a sole photographer.

While Domon is a popular and celebrated figure in Japan, he remains less known abroad. An exhibition curated by Rossella Menegazzo, presented in Rome in 2017 and in Paris in 2023, has permitted the European public to discover Domon's oeuvre.

== Publications ==
=== Books by Domon ===
- Nihon no chōkoku (日本の彫刻). Tokyo: Bijutsushuppansha, 1952.
  - 2. Asuka jidai (飛鳥時代).
  - 5. Heian jidai (平安時代).
- Fūbō (風貌). Tokyo: Ars, 1953.
- Murōji (室生寺). Tokyo: Bijutsushuppansha, 1955.
- The Muro-ji, an eighth century Japanese temple: Its art and history. Tokyo: Bijutsu Shuppansha, c. 1954. Text by Roy Andrew Miller.
- With 渡辺勉. Gendai geijutsu kōza (現代芸術講座 写真). 1956.
- Murōji (室生寺). Tokyo: Bijutsushuppansha, 1957.
- Domon Ken sakuhinshū (土門拳作品集). Gendai Nihon shashin zenshū 2. 創元社, 1958.
- Hiroshima (ヒロシマ) / Hiroshima. 研光社, 1958.
- Chūsonji (中尊寺). Nihon no Tera 4. Tokyo: Bijutsushuppansha, 1959.
- Saihōji, Ryūanji (西芳寺・竜安寺). Nihon no tera 10. Tokyo: Bijutsushuppansha, 1959.
- Chikuhō no kodomotachi: Ken Domon shashinshū (筑豊のこどもたち：土門拳写真集). Patoria Shoten, 1960. 築地書館, 1977.
- Chikuhō no kodomotachi: Ken Domon shashinshū. Zoku: Rumie-chan ha otōsan ga shinda (筑豊のこどもたち：土門拳写真集 続 るみえちゃんはお父さんが死んだ). Patoria Shoten, 1960.
- Hōryūji (法隆寺). Nihon no Tera 6. Tokyo: Bijutsushuppansha, 1961.
- Murōji (室生寺). Nihon no Tera 13. Tokyo: Bijutsushuppansha, 1961.
- Kyōto (京都). Nihon no Tera. Tokyo: Bijutsushuppansha, 1961.
- Nara (奈良). Nihon no Tera. Tokyo: Bijutsushuppansha, 1961.
- (in English) Masterpieces of Japanese sculpture Tokyo: Bijutsuhuppansha; Rutland, Vt.: Tuttle, 1961. Text by J. E. Kidder.
- Kasuga (春日). Nihon no Yashiro 4. Tokyo: Bijutsushuppansha, 1962.
- Koji junrei (古寺巡礼). 5 vols. Tokyo: Bijutsushuppansha, 1963–75. International edition (with English texts added to the Japanese): A Pilgrimage to Ancient Temples. Tokyo: Bijutsushuppansha, 1980.
- Tōji: Daishinomitera (東寺: 大師のみてら). Tokyo: Bijutsushuppansha, 1965.
- Shigaraki Ōtsubo (信楽大壷). Tokyo: Chūnichi Shinbun Shuppankyoku, 1965.
- Sōfū; his boundless world of flowers and form. Tokyo: Kodansha International, 1966. Text by Teshigahara Sōfu.
- Nihonjin no genzō (日本人の原像). Tokyo: Heibonsha, 1966.
- Yakushiji (薬師寺). Tokyo: Mainichi Shinbunsha, 1971.
- Bunraku (文楽). Kyoto: Shinshindō, 1972.
- Tōdaiji (東大寺). Tokyo: Heibonsha, 1973.
- (in Japanese) Nihon meishōden (日本名匠伝). Kyoto: Shinshindō, 1974. Portraits of the famous, mostly in color.
- Koyō henreki (古窯遍歴). Tokyo: Yarai Shoin, 1974.
- Shinu koto to ikiru koto (死ぬことと生きること). 築地書館, 1974.
- (in Japanese) Watakushi no bigaku (私の美学, My aesthetics). Kyoto: Shinshindō, 1975. Domon photographs Japanese arts and architecture (in both black and white and color), and writes commentary on these.
- Nihon no bi (日本の美). Nishinomiya: Itō Hamu Eiyō Shokuhin, 1978.
- Shashin hihyō (写真批評). Daviddosha, 1978.
- Nyoninkōya Murōji (女人高野室生寺). Tokyo: Bijutsushuppansha, 1978.
- (in Japanese) Fūkei (風景). Tokyo: Yarai Shoin, 1976. Popular edition, Tokyo: Yarai Shoin, 1978.
- Gendai chōkoku: Chōkoku no Mori Bijutsukan korekushon (現代彫刻: 彫刻の森美術館コレクション) / Sculptures modernes: Collection de The Hakone Open-air Museum. Tokyo: Sankei Shinbunsha, 1979. With some French as well as Japanese text.
- Shashin zuihitsu (写真随筆). Tokyo: Daviddosha, 1979.
- Domon Ken Nihon no Chōkoku(土門拳日本の彫刻). Tokyo: Bijutsushuppansha.
  - 1. Asuka, Nara (飛鳥・奈良). 1979.
  - 2. Heian zenki (平安前期). 1980.
  - 3. Heian kōki, Kamakura (平安後期・鎌倉). 1980.
- Domon Ken: Sono shūi no shōgen (土門拳：その周囲の証言). Tokyo: Asahi Sonorama, 1980.
- Nihon no bien (日本の美艶). Gendai Nihon Shashin Zenshū 7. Tokyo: Shūeisha, 1980.
- Domon Ken Nihon no kotōji: Tanba, Imari, Karatsu, Eshino, Oribe, Tokoname, Atsumi, Shigaraki, Kutani, Bizen (土門拳日本の古陶磁：丹波・伊万里・唐津・絵志野・織部・常滑・渥美・信楽・九谷・備前). Tokyo: Bijutsushuppansha, 1981.
- (in Japanese) Domon Ken (土門拳). Shōwa Shashin Zenshigoto 5. Tokyo: Asahi Shuppansha, 1982. A survey of Domon's work.
- Domon Ken zenshū (土門拳全集). Tokyo: Shōgakukan.
  - 1. Koji junrei 1 Yamato-hen jō (古寺巡礼 1 大和篇 上). 1983. ISBN 4-09-559001-7.
  - 2. Koji junrei 2 Yamato-hen ge (古寺巡礼 2 大和篇 下). 1984. ISBN 4-09-559002-5.
  - 3. Koji junrei 3 Kyōto-hen (京都篇). ISBN 4-09-559003-3.
  - 4. Koji junrei 4 Zenkoku-hen (古寺巡礼 4 全国篇). 1984. ISBN 4-09-559004-1.
  - 5. Nyonin Kōya Muroji (女人高野室生寺). 1984. ISBN 4-09-559005-X.
  - 6. Bunraku (文楽). 1985. ISBN 4-09-559006-8.
  - 7. Dentō no katachi (伝統のかたち). 1984. ISBN 4-09-559007-6.
  - 8. Nihon no fūkei (日本の風景). 1984. ISBN 4-09-559008-4.
  - 9. Fūbō (風貌). 1984. ISBN 4-09-559009-2.
  - 10. Hiroshima (ヒロシマ). 1985. ISBN 4-09-559010-6.
  - 11. Chikuhō no kodomotachi (筑豊のこどもたち). 1985. ISBN 4-09-559011-4.
  - 12. Kessakusen jō (傑作選 上). 1985. ISBN 4-09-559012-2.
  - 13. Kessakusen ge (傑作選 下). 1985. ISBN 4-09-559013-0.
- Domon Ken no koji junrei (土門拳の古寺巡礼). Tokyo: Shōgakukan, 1989–90.
  - 1. Yamato 1 (大和1). 1989. ISBN 4-09-559101-3.
  - 2. Yamato 2 (大和2). 1990. ISBN 4-09-559102-1.
  - 3. Kyōto 1. (京都1). 1989. ISBN 4-09-559103-X.
  - 4. Kyōto 2. (京都2). 1990. ISBN 4-09-559104-8.
  - 5. Murōji (室生寺). 1990. ISBN 4-09-559105-6.
  - Bessatsu 1. Higashi Nihon (東日本). 1990. ISBN 4-09-559106-4.
  - Bessatsu 2. Nishi Nihon (西日本). 1990. ISBN 4-09-559107-2.
- Domon Ken Nihon no butsuzō (土門拳日本の仏像). Tokyo: Shōgakukan, 1992. ISBN 4-09-699421-9.
- Murōji (室生寺). Nihon Meikenchiku Shashinsenshū 1. Tokyo: Shinchōsha, 1992. ISBN 4-10-602620-1.
- Domon Ken no Shōwa (土門拳の昭和). Tokyo: Shōgakukan, 1995.
  - 1. Fūbō (風貌). ISBN 4-09-559201-X.
  - 2. Kodomotachi (こどもたち). ISBN 4-09-559202-8.
  - 3. Nihon no fūkei (日本の風景). ISBN 4-09-559203-6.
  - 4. Dokyumento Nihon 1935–1967 (ドキュメント日本 1935–1967). ISBN 4-09-559204-4.
  - 5. Nihon no butsuzō (日本の仏像). ISBN 4-09-559205-2.
- Koji junrei (古寺巡礼). Tokyo: Mainichi Shinbunsha, c1995.
- Domon Ken Koji Junrei (土門拳古寺巡礼). Tokyo: Bijutsu Shuppansha, 1996. ISBN 4-568-12056-X.
- Shashin to jinsei: Domon Ken esseishū (写真と人生：土門拳エッセイ集). Dōjidai Raiburarī. Tokyo: Iwanami, 1997.
- (in Japanese) Domon Ken (土門拳). Nihon no Shashinka. Tokyo: Iwanami, 1998. ISBN 4-00-008356-2.
- Koji junrei (古寺巡礼). Tokyo: Shōgakukan, 1998. ISBN 4-09-681151-3.
- 風貌 愛蔵版 Tokyo: Shōgakukan, 1999. ISBN 4-09-681152-1.
- Domon Ken kottō no bigaku (土門拳骨董の美学). Korona Bukkusu 69. Tokyo: Heibonsha, 1999. ISBN 4-582-63366-8.
- Domon Ken no tsutaetakatta Nihon (土門拳の伝えたかった日本) Tokyo: Mainichi Shuppansha, 2000. ISBN 4-620-60559-X.
- Domon Ken Nihon no chōkoku (土門拳日本の彫刻 Tokyo: Mainichi Shinbunsha, c2000. Exhibition catalogue.
- Kengan (拳眼). Tokyo: Sekai Bunkasha, 2001. ISBN 4-418-01521-3.
- Kenshin (拳心). Tokyo: Sekai Bunkasha, 2001. ISBN 4-418-01522-1.
- Kenkon (拳魂). Tokyo: Sekai Bunkasha, 2002. ISBN 4-418-02509-X.
- 逆白波のひと・土門拳の生涯 / 佐高信∥ Āto Serekushon. Tokyo: Shōgakukan, 2003.
- Domon Ken tsuyoku utsukushii mono: Nihon bitanbō (土門拳強く美しいもの：日本美探訪) Shōgakukan Bunko. Tokyo: Shōgakukan, 2003. ISBN 4-09-411426-2.

=== Books with works by Domon ===
- Association to Establish the Japan Peace Museum, ed. Ginza to sensō (銀座と戦争) / Ginza and the War. Tokyo: Atelier for Peace, 1986. ISBN 4-938365-04-9. Domon is one of ten photographers — the others are Shigeo Hayashi, Tadahiko Hayashi, Kōyō Ishikawa, Kōyō Kageyama, Shunkichi Kikuchi, Ihei Kimura, Kōji Morooka, Minoru Ōki, and Maki Sekiguchi — who provide 340 photographs for this well-illustrated and large photographic history of Ginza from 1937 to 1947. Captions and text in both Japanese and English.
- (Joint work) Bunshi no shōzō hyakujūnin (文士の肖像一一〇人, Portraits of 110 literati). Tokyo: Asahi Shinbunsha, 1990. ISBN 4-02-258466-1. Domon is one of five photographers — the others are Shōtarō Akiyama, Hiroshi Hamaya, Ihei Kimura and Tadahiko Hayashi.
- Kaku: Hangenki (核：半減期) / The Half Life of Awareness: Photographs of Hiroshima and Nagasaki. Tokyo: Tokyo Metropolitan Museum of Photography, 1995. Exhibition catalogue; captions and text in both Japanese and English. There are 12 pages of photographs taken by Domon in 1957 and 1967 of Hiroshima, particularly of medical treatment; (other works are by Toshio Fukada, Kikujirō Fukushima, Shigeo Hayashi, Kenji Ishiguro, Shunkichi Kikuchi, Mitsugi Kishida, Eiichi Matsumoto, Yoshito Matsushige, Shōmei Tōmatsu, Hiromi Tsuchida and Yōsuke Yamahata). Text and captions in both Japanese and English.
- (in Japanese) Mishima Yasushi (三島靖). Kimura Ihee to Domon Ken: Shashin to sono shōgai (木村伊兵衛と土門拳：写真とその生涯, Ihei Kimura and Ken Domon: Photography and biography). Tokyo: Heibonsha, 1995. ISBN 4-582-23107-1. Reprint. Heibonsha Library. Tokyo: Heibonsha, 2004. ISBN 4-582-76488-6.
- Dokyumentarī no jidai: Natori Yōnosuke, Kimura Ihee, Domon Ken, Miki Jun no shashin kara (ドキュメンタリーの時代：名取洋之助・木村伊兵衛・土門 拳・三木淳の写真から) / The Documentary Age: Photographs by Natori Younosuke, Kimura Ihei, Domon Ken, and Miki Jun. Tokyo: Tokyo Metropolitan Museum of Photography, 2001. An exhibition catalogue. Captions in both Japanese and English, other text in Japanese only.
- Hiraki, Osamu, and Keiichi Takeuchi. Japan, a Self-Portrait: Photographs 1945–1964. Paris: Flammarion, 2004. ISBN 2-08-030463-1. Domon is one of eleven photographers whose works appear in this large book (the others are Hiroshi Hamaya, Tadahiko Hayashi, Eikoh Hosoe, Yasuhiro Ishimoto, Kikuji Kawada, Ihei Kimura, Shigeichi Nagano, Ikkō Narahara, Takeyoshi Tanuma, and Shōmei Tōmatsu).
- Kindai shashin no umi no oya: Kimura Ihee to Domon Ken (近代写真の生みの親：木村伊兵衛と土門拳) / Kimura Ihei and Domon Ken. Tokyo: Asahi Shinbunsha and Mainichi Shinbunsha, 2004. Catalogue of an exhibition.
- (in Japanese) Sengo shashin / Saisei to tenkai (戦後写真・再生と展開) / Twelve Photographers in Japan, 1945–55. Yamaguchi: Yamaguchi Prefectural Museum of Art, 1990. Despite the alternative title in English, almost exclusively in Japanese (although each of the twelve has a potted chronology in English). Catalogue of an exhibition held at Yamaguchi Prefectural Museum of Art. Twenty of Domon's photographs of children in Tokyo appear on pp. 18–28.
- Szarkowski, John, and Shōji Yamagishi. New Japanese Photography. New York: Museum of Modern Art, 1974. ISBN 0-87070-503-2 (hard), ISBN 0-87070-503-2 (paper).

=== Books on Domon ===
- Satake Makoto (佐高信). Sakashiranami no hito: Domon Ken no shōgai (逆白波のひと・土門拳の生涯). Tokyo: Shōgakukan, 2003. ISBN 4-09-607015-7.
