= Tadahiko Hayashi =

Japanese photographer (1918–1990)

- 林 忠彦
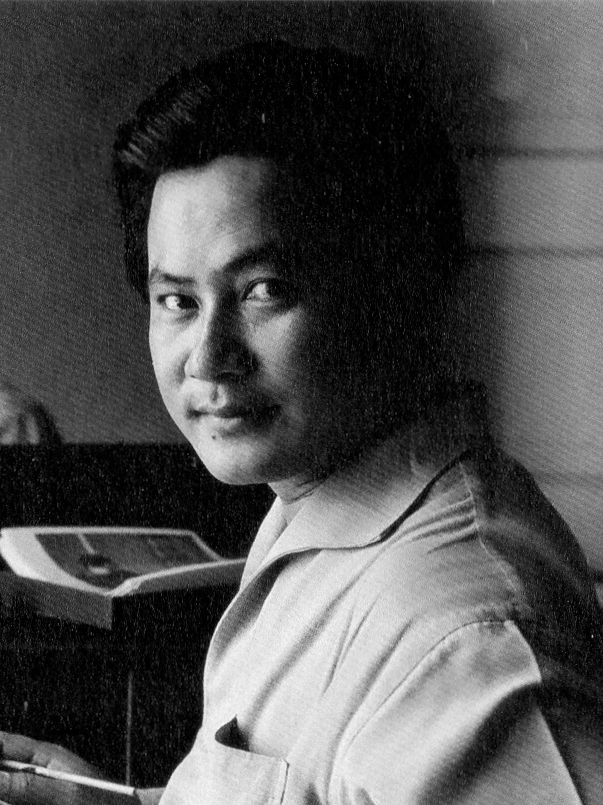
- Hayashi in a Los Angeles hotel, 1955
- Born: 5 March 1918
- Died: 18 December 1990 (aged 72)
- Occupation: Photographer

Tadahiko Hayashi (Japanese: 林 忠彦, Hepburn: Hayashi Tadahiko; 1918–1990) was a Japanese photographer noted for a wide range of work including documentary (particularly genre scenes of the period immediately after the war) and portraiture.

== Youth and early career ==
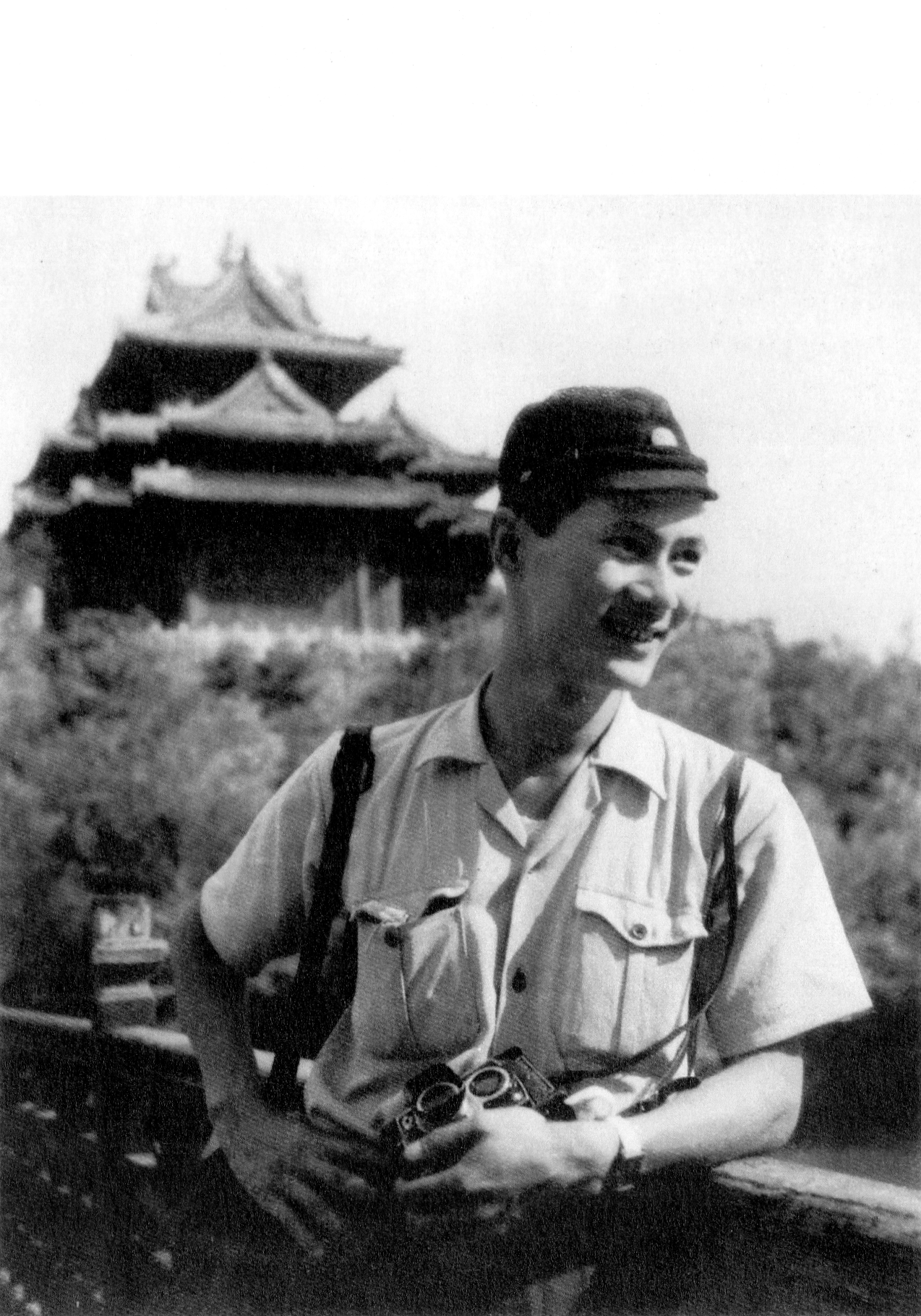
Hayashi Tadahiko in Beijing during the war

Hayashi was born in Saiwai-chō, Tokuyama (since 2003 part of Shūnan), Yamaguchi (Japan) on 5 March 1918, to a family running a photographic studio (Hayashi Shashin-kan, 林写真館). The boy's mother, Ishi Hayashi (林イシ, Hayashi Ishi) was an accomplished photographer, particularly of portraits, taught by her father; his father, Shin'ichi Hayashi (林真一, Hayashi Shin'ichi) was a mediocre photographer and a spendthrift; the boy's grandfather forced the parents to divorce and the boy grew up with his mother and surrounded by photography. He did well at school, where he took photographs.

Hayashi graduated from school in 1935, and his mother determined that he would apprentice himself to the photographer Shōichi Nakayama (中山正一, Nakayama Shōichi). Nakayama was based in Ashiya, Hyōgo, but had a second studio in Shinsaibashi, Osaka. Hayashi did much running of errands between the two. On one occasion he passed the Ashiya studio of the photographer Iwata Nakayama late at night and was reinspired in photography by his realization of the effort Nakayama was putting in. A year later he contracted tuberculosis and returned to Tokuyama, where he enthusiastically practiced photography while recuperating, and participated in the group Neko-no-me-kai (猫の眼会, “Cat's-Eye Group”) under the photographer Sakae Tamura using the name Jōmin Hayashi (林城民, Hayashi Jōmin).

In 1937 Hayashi went to Tokyo, where he studied at the Oriental School of Photography (オリエンタル写真学校, Orientaru Shashin Gakkō), again under Tamura. On his graduation the following year, he returned to Tokuyama, but “spent a year in dissipation, drinking heavily every night”. Yet he managed to retain his interest and prowess in photography. In 1938, Hayashi took part in the launch of the Youth Reportage Photography Research Association (Seinen Hōdō Shashin Kenkyūkai), a group formed with the support of Photo Times and associated with photographers including Ken Domon and Hiroshi Hamaya. In 1939 his family decided to make a final allowance to him of ¥200, which he quickly wasted in Tokyo on food and drink. Tamura got him a job in a developing and printing firm in Yokohama, where he worked at both printmaking and commercial photography. A few months later he moved to Tōkyō Kōgeisha (東京光芸社) in Ginza, where he soon had an unexpected opportunity to demonstrate his unusual command, gained in Yokohama, of flash illumination. Demand for his services increased. He married Akiko Sasaki (佐々木秋子, Sasaki Akiko), from Tokuyama.

In 1940 Hayashi's photographs appeared in the photography magazine Shashin Shūhō, and the next year also the women's magazine Fujin Kōron, and Asahi Camera. The couple had their first child, a son, Yasuhiko (靖彦).

In 1942 Hayashi went to the Japanese embassy in Beijing, with the North China News Photography Association (華北広報写真協会, Kahoku Kōhō-shashin Kyōkai), which he had just cofounded. While in China he did a lot of work with what was then regarded as a wide-angle lens; this led to his nickname of Waido no Chū-san (ワイドの忠さん, “wide Mr Chū”).

Hayashi's photographs were published in the women's magazines Fujin Kōron and Shinjoen and the photography magazines Shashin Bunka and Shashin Shūhō. The couple had their second son, Jun (潤), in 1943.

== Rotgut era ==
Hayashi was still in Beijing at the end of the war. He returned to Japan with Jun Yoshida (吉田潤, Yoshida Jun) in 1946. The family photo studio had been destroyed, but with Yoshida he set up a new studio, busily churning out photographs for twenty or more kasutori magazines (カストリ雑誌, kasutori-zasshi) (cheap, sensational and short-lived magazines) every month. As Hayashi would later describe it, Yoshida would tell publishers that he photographed women, and Hayashi (later renowned for his portraits of men) would tell them that he photographed anything other than women. The ploy seems to have worked: he was frenetically busy, and the photographer Shōji Ueda later termed him “[t]he first professional photographer in Japan”. He also found time to remarry in 1946, his second wife being Kane Watanabe (渡辺カネ, Watanabe Kane); they had a son, Hidehiko (英比古), in 1947.

Always gregarious, Hayashi had friends and acquaintances among the buraiha (dissolute writers), and his portraits of Osamu Dazai and Sakunosuke Oda, both taken in the Lupin (ルパン, Rupan) bar, are now famous. At the end of that year, the literary magazine Shōsetsu Shinchō published the first of Hayashi's series of portraits, titled Bunshi (literati), of chūkan bungaku (中間文学), other writers and figures close to the world of literature, in its January 1948 issue; the series would continue until 1949 and was later collected into an anthology. Hayashi's portraits show their subjects in context, and the combination of their subject matter and the method by which he took them — by his own account intermediate (chūkan) between the tense, decisive style of Ken Domon and the relaxed, informal style of Ihei Kimura — led them to be termed “intermediate photographs” (中間写真, chūkan shashin). The series of portraits that he was commissioned to take remained fresh; that of an unposed (and unsuspecting) Jun'ichirō Tanizaki is particularly famous.

Meanwhile, his portraits of orphans and the desperate but sometimes pleasurable life of the city were run in camera magazines, general-interest magazines, and more surprisingly in Fujin Kōron; these too would be anthologized, first in 1980 in a book, Kasutori Jidai (カストリ時代, "The rotgut period"), that has a lasting reputation as a historic document.

By 1954 Hayashi and the photographers Shōtarō Akiyama and Kira Sugiyama were sharing a studio in the basement of the Nihon Seimei Building, a dirty old building (subsequently demolished) in Hibiya (Chiyoda-ku).

In the early 1950s, a strong trend toward photographing unaltered reality was fueled by manifestos in camera magazines by Ken Domon and others; Hayashi bucked this by arranging his photographs so that the whole and every part would form a flawless composition, staging if this were necessary. For this reason he is commonly regarded as very unlike a photographer such as Ihei Kimura.

In 1950 his fourth son was born.

Through this period Hayashi was busily cofounding and participating in various organizations of photographers. Together with Eiichi Akaho (赤穂英一, Akaho Eiichi), Shōtarō Akiyama, Ryōsuke Ishizu, Yōichi Midorikawa and Shōji Ueda, he was a founding member of Ginryūsha in 1947; the group would meet once every two months, for discussion and drinking. A year later he joined Ken Domon, Ihei Kimura, Shigeru Tamura and others in founding the Photographers' Group (写真家集団, Shashinka Shūdan), which would later become the Japan Photographers Association (日本写真家協会, Nihon Shashinka Kyōkai). In 1953 he was a founding member of the photography section of Nika Society (二科会写真部, Nikakai shashinbu).

== America and later work ==
In 1955 Hayashi accompanied Keiko Takahashi (高橋敬緯子, Takahashi Keiko), Japan's contender, to the Miss Universe contest in Florida; his photographs of the trips appeared in magazines. For decades thereafter they were little known, but forty were exhibited in a major posthumous retrospective, where they reminded viewers that Hayashi did not need to stage and excelled at the snapshot too; though his photographs still contrasted with Kimura's in the subjects' awareness of being photographed.

He also appeared in the film Jūninin no shashinka (12人の写真家, Twelve photographers), directed by Hiroshi Teshigawara (勅使河原宏, Teshigawara Hiroshi).

Two years later, the first of Hayashi's books was published: Shōsetsu no furusato (The village settings of stories) for which Hayashi traveled around Japan to the settings of novels and short stories, looking for and sometimes staging the scenes that are echoed in the fiction. It would be seven more years before his second book was published (a pace that was normal at the time), and the photographs that had made him famous in the kasutori period would only be anthologized from the 1980s.

Hayashi's middle age had its setbacks. His wife died in 1961, his tuberculosis recurred in 1970, and his second son Jun died in 1973. But he continued to produce books, notably the lavish Nihon no gaka 108-nin, portraits of and representative works by 108 Japanese painters, which won both the Mainichi Arts Prize and the Japan Photographers Association's Annual Prize a year after its publication in 1977.

In the early 1980s Hayashi traveled around Japan, taking photographs for a number of photo books. However, in 1985 he announced that he had cancer of the liver. This did not stop him from working: he embarked on work for a book of photographs for a book on the Tōkaidō, suggesting to Yōichi Midorikawa that Midorikawa should do another on the San'yōdō. Hayashi survived publication of his own book by two months; Midorikawa's book only came out a year later.

From 1980 until 1989 Hayashi was principal of the photographic academy Nihon Shashin Gakuen (日本写真学園).

Hayashi's works are displayed by the Shunan City Museum of Art and History in Shūnan, Yamaguchi.

== Gallery ==
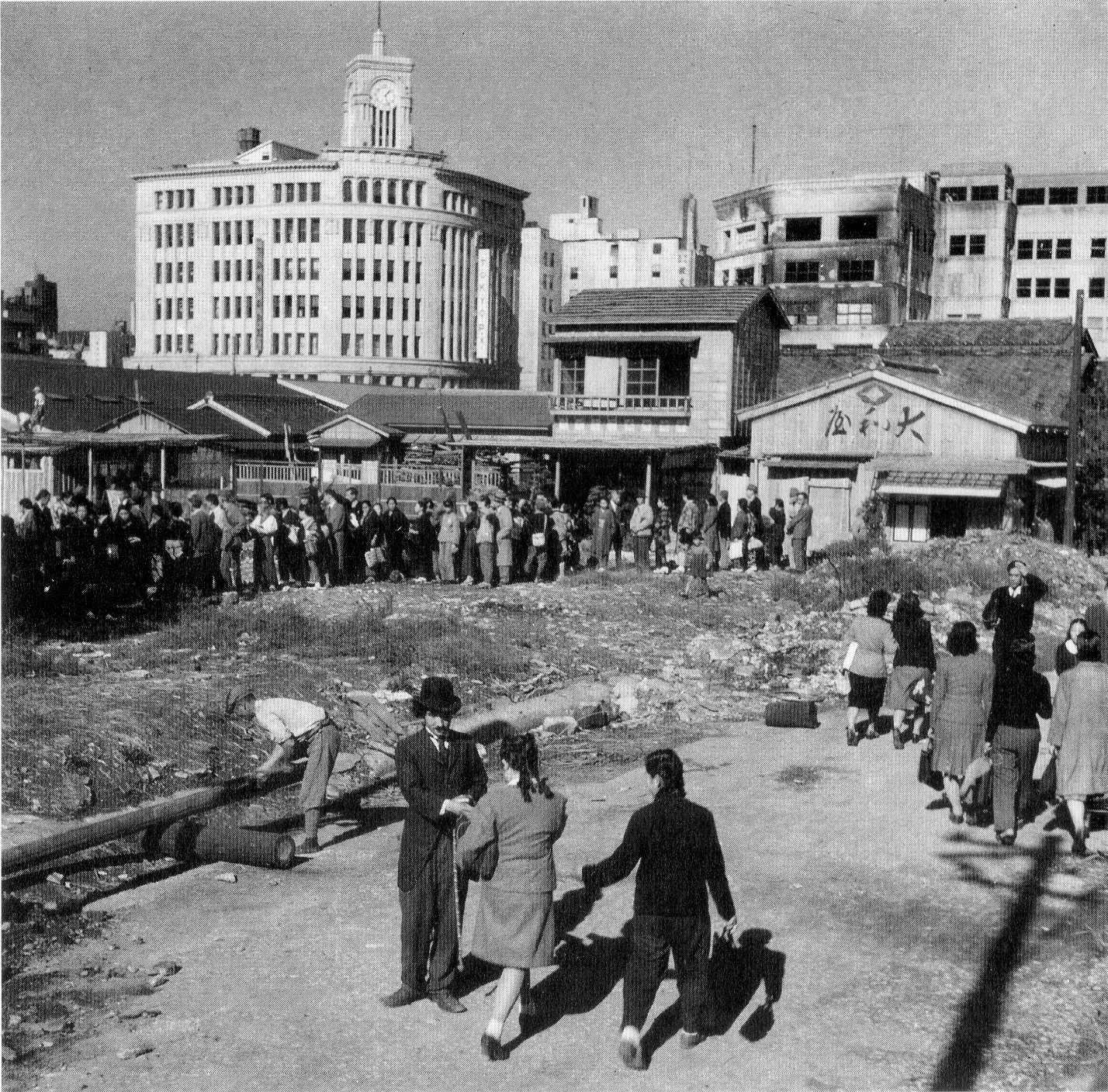
A long line for food distribution - Ginza, Tokyo 1946

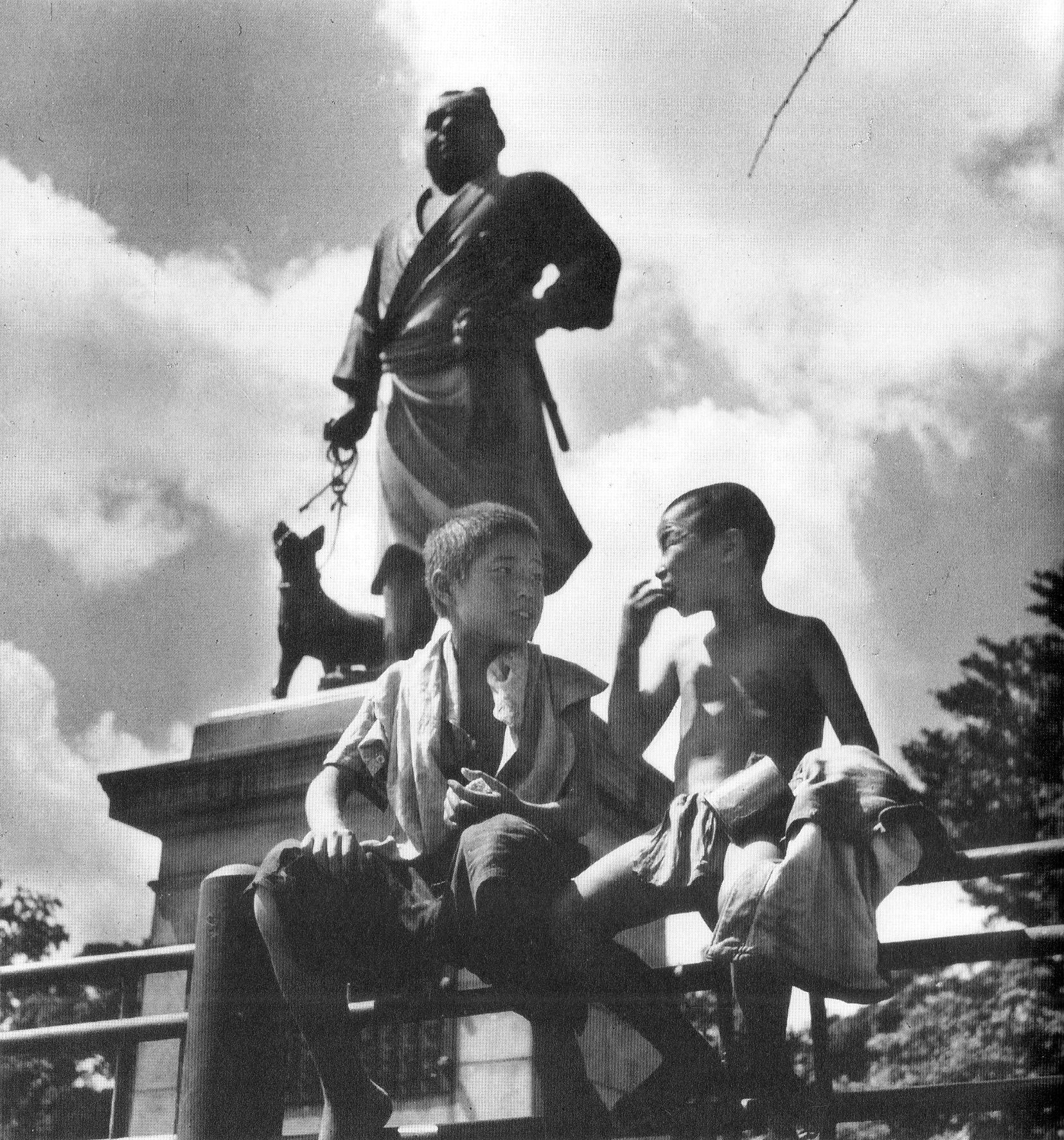
Japanese war-orphaned boys in Ueno park, Tokyō in 1946

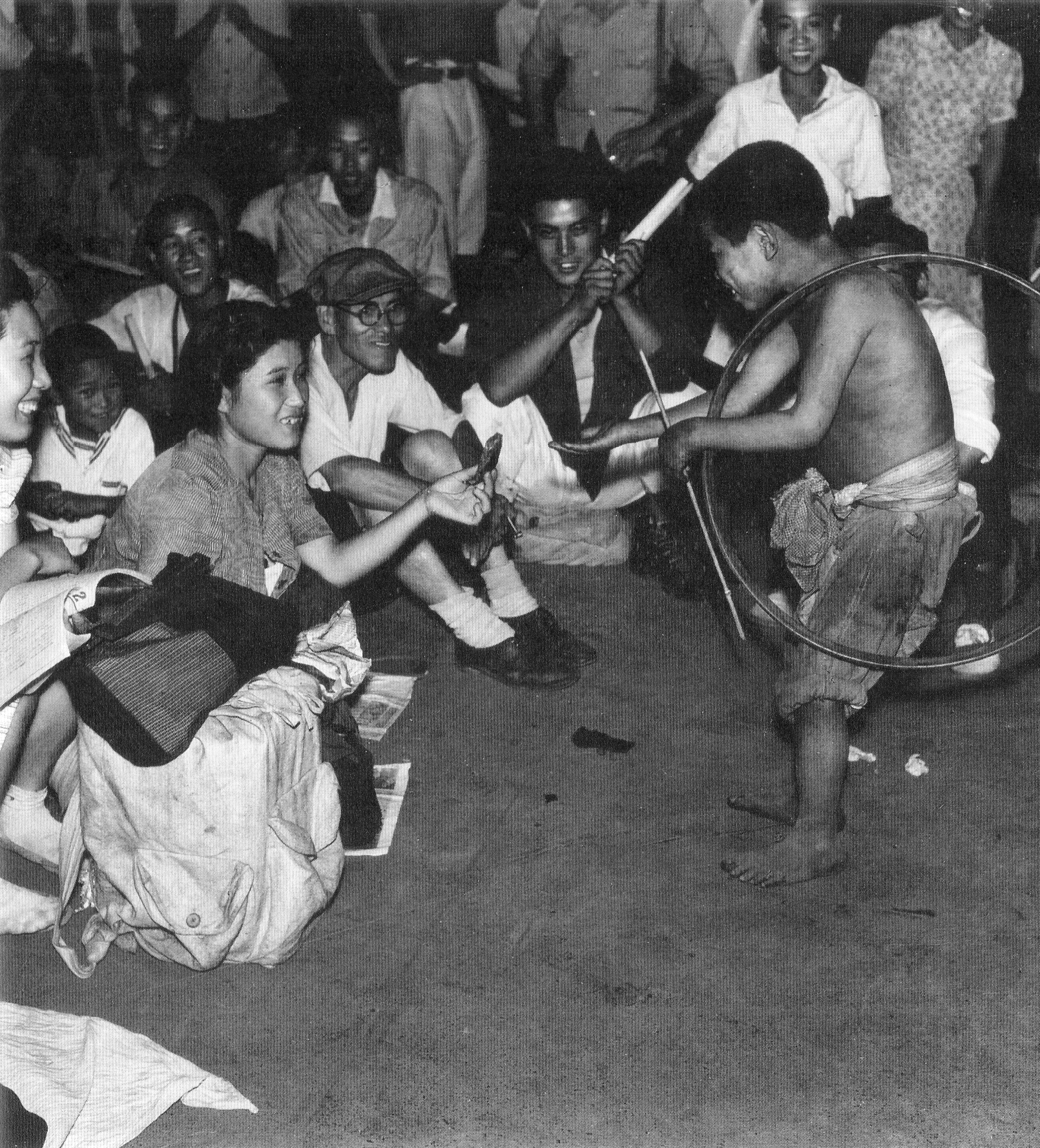
A Japanese war-orphaned begging boy spinning a hoop - Ueno Station, 1946

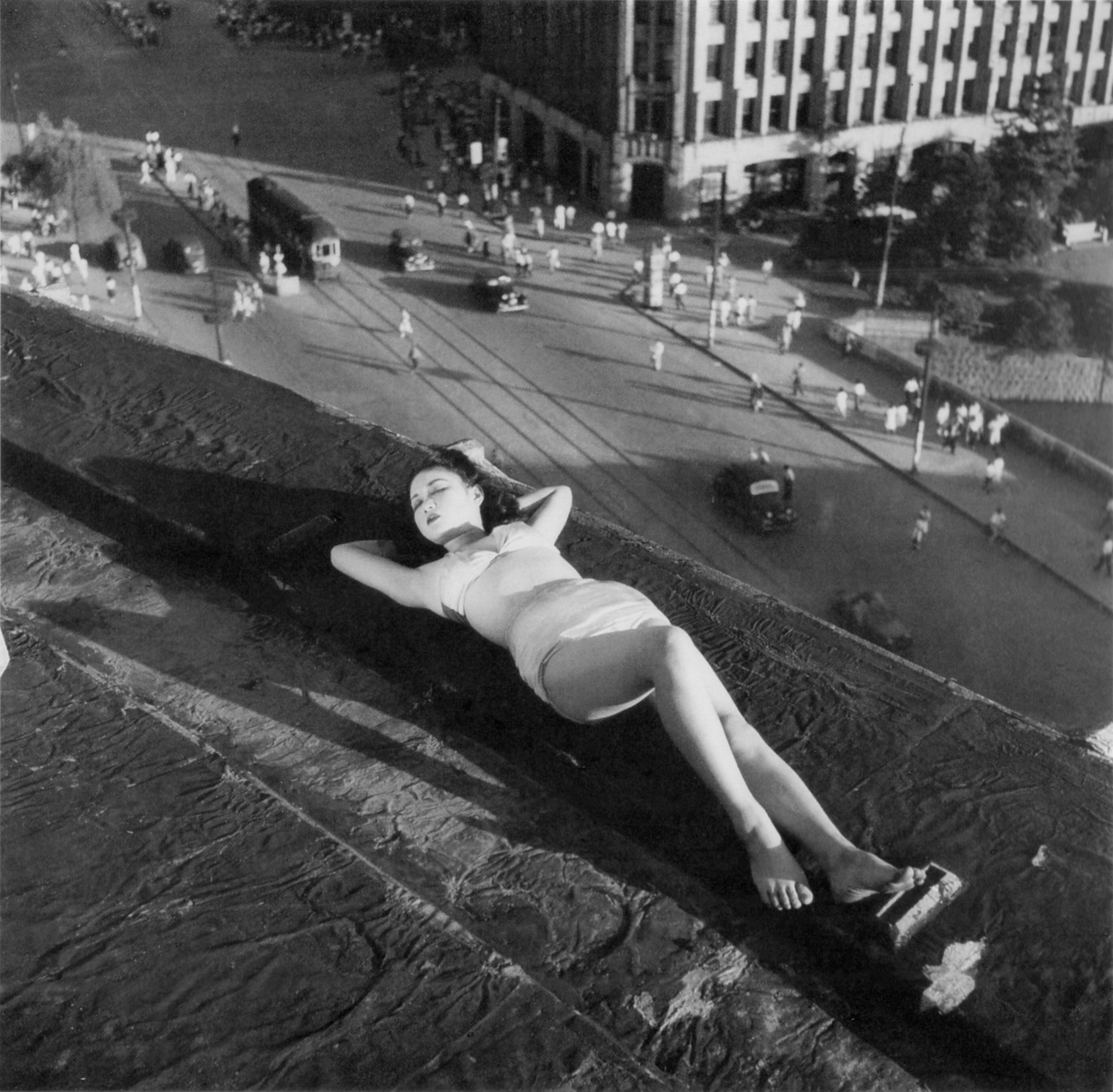
A dancer on the rooftop of Nippon Theater, 1947

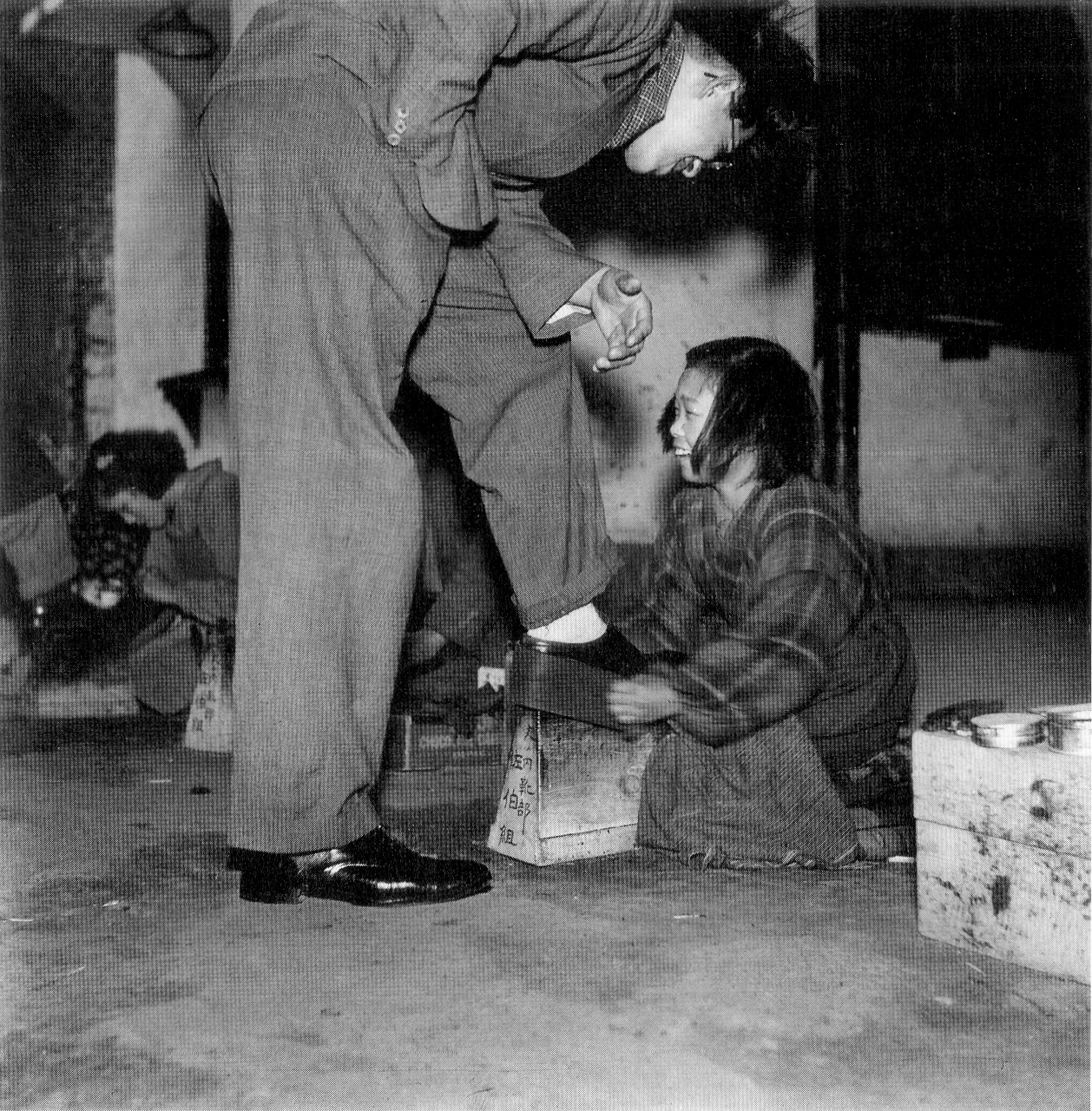
A Japanese war-orphaned girl shoeshining in Yūrakuchō, Tokyō in 1947

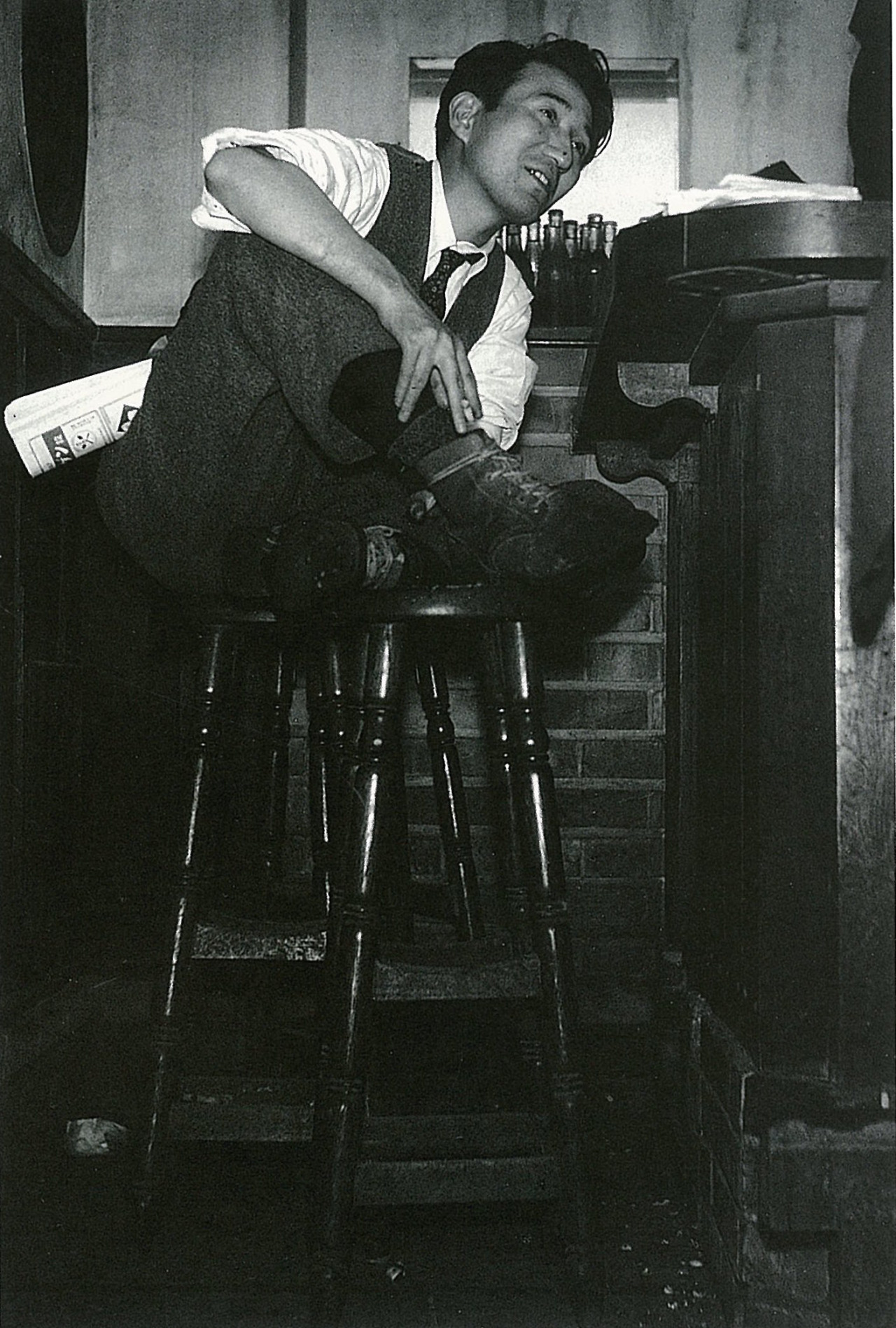
Osamu Dazai, 1946

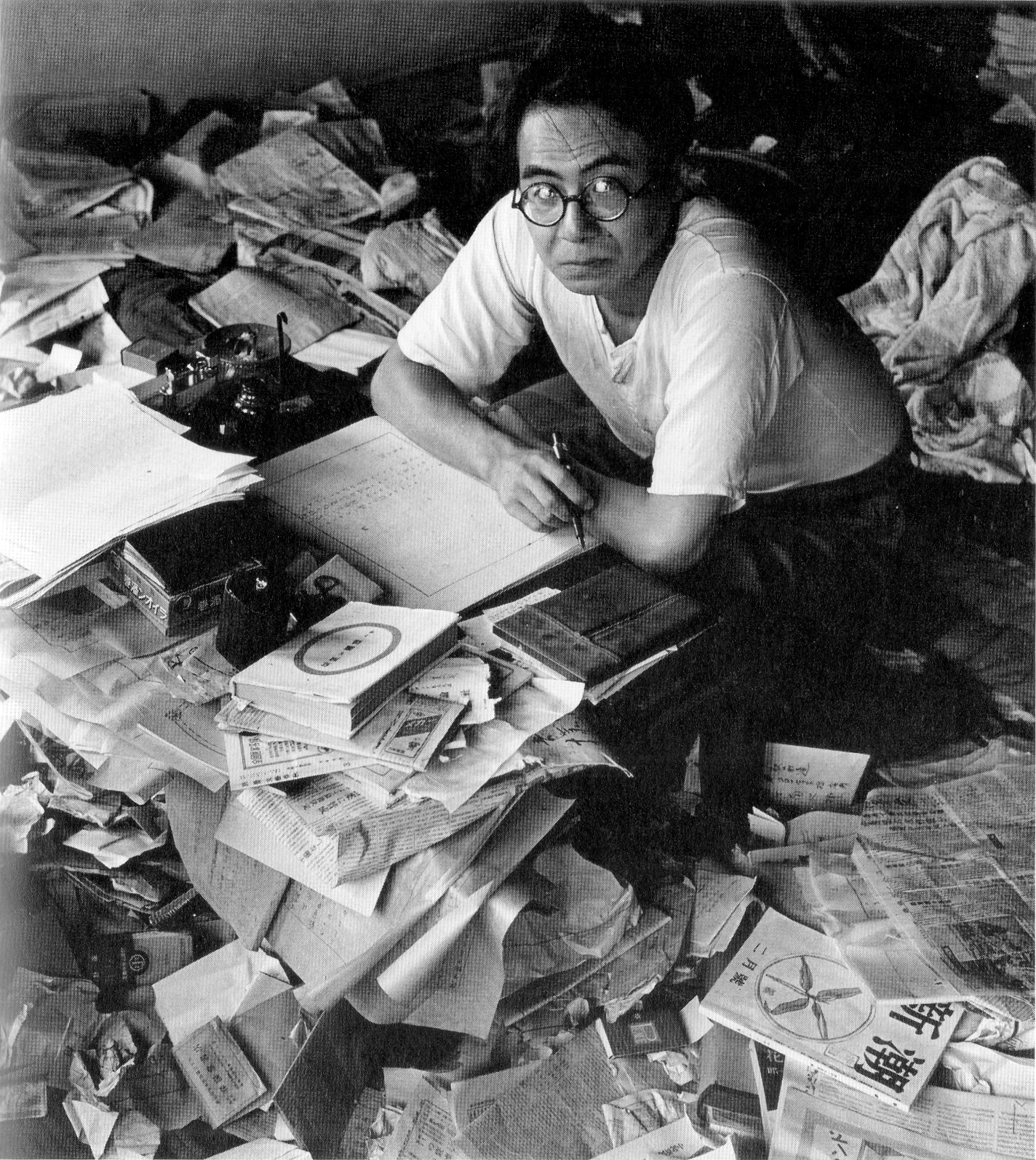
Sakaguchi Ango, 1947

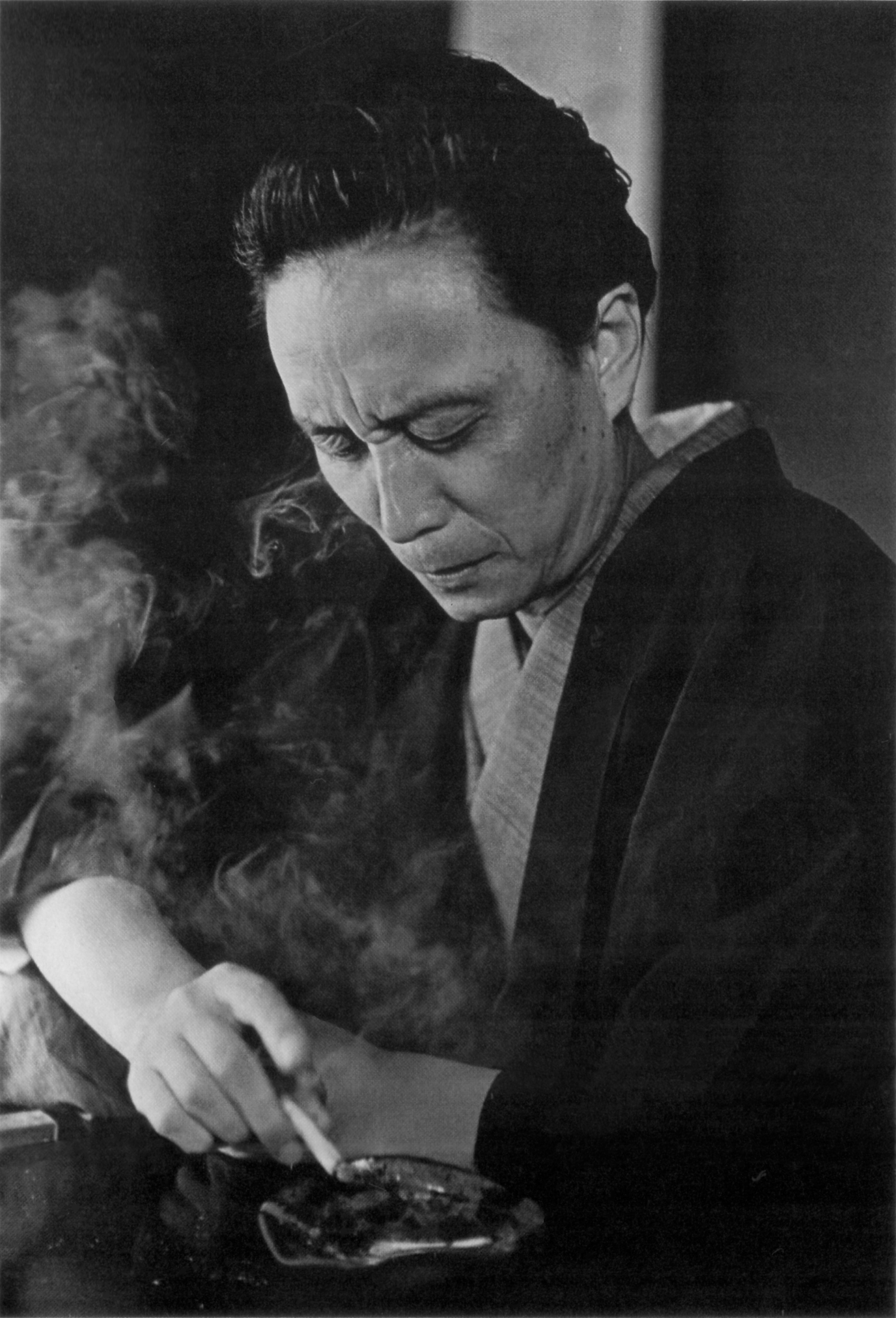
Takami Jun, 1952

== Solo exhibitions ==
- "Amami-ōshima" (奄美大島), Chūkō Garō (Tokyo), 1954.
- "Taibei shashinten" (滞米写真展), Matsuya (Ginza, Tokyo), 1955
- "Shōsetsu no furusato" (小説のふるさと), Konishiroku Photo Gallery (Tokyo), 1957
- "Nihon no sakka-ten" (日本の作家展), Tōkyū (Shibuya, Tokyo), 1971
- "Kasutori jidai" (カストリ時代), Fuji Photo Salon) (Tokyo and Osaka, 1980
- "Nagasaki, umi to jūjika" (長崎・海と十字架), Contax Gallery (Tokyo and Fukuoka), 1980
- "Sekai no machi kara" (世界の街から), Shinjuku Olympus Gallery (Shinjuku, Tokyo), 1980; Wakita Gallery (Nagoya), 1981
- "Wakaki shura-tachi no sato: Chōshūji" (若き修羅たちの里 長州路), Contax Gallery (Tokyo and Fukuoka), 1981
- "Nihon no iemoto" (日本の家元), Kyocera Contax Salon (Ginza), 1983
- "Nagasaki" (長崎), Obihiro Camera Gallery (Obihiro), 1983
- "Saigō Takamori" (西郷隆盛), Fukuoka Art Museum (Fukuoka), 1984
- "Arishihi no sakka-tachi" (ありし日の作家たち), Pentax Forum (Tokyo), 1984
- "Bunshi no jidai" (文士の時代), Fuji Photo Gallery (Tokyo), 1986
- "Chaya" (茶屋), Kyocera Contax Salon (Ginza), 1986
- "Dentō to bunka e no manazashi" (伝統と文化へのまなざし), Wakō Hall (Ginza, Tokyo), 1988
- "Yomigaetta heiwa no naka de" (甦った平和のなかで), Fuji Photo Gallery (Tokyo), 1988
- "Hayashi Tadahiko 50-nen shashin sōshūten" (林忠彦50年写真総集展), Tokuyama-shi Bunka Kaikan (Tokuyama), 1988; Keihan department store (Moriguchi, Osaka), 1989; Yokohama Civic Art Gallery (Yokohama), 1990
- "Hayashi Tadahiko no jidai" (林忠彦の時代), Shinjuku Konica Plaza (Shinjuku, Tokyo), 1990
- "Tōkaidō o toru" (東海道を撮る), Wakō Hall (Ginza, Tokyo); also Tokuyama and Osaka, 1991
- "Hayashi Tadahiko sakuhinten" (林忠彦作品展), two-part exhibition at JCII Photo Salon (Tokyo), 1991
- "Jidai no shashu" (時代の射手), Shimonoseki City Art Museum (Shimonoseki), 1991
- "Hayashi Tadahiko no sekai" (林忠彦の世界) / "Tadahiko Hayashi", Tokyo Metropolitan Museum of Photography (Ebisu, Tokyo), 1993
- "Kasutori jidai" (カストリ時代), Fuji Film Square (Ginza, Tokyo), 2007
- "Hayashi Tadahiko no sekai" (林忠彦の世界), Keihan Gallery (Moriguchi, Osaka), 2009
- "Shinjuku, jidai no katachi: Kasutori jidai, bunshi no jidai" (新宿・時代の貌 カストリ時代・文士の時代, Shinjuku, the shape of the times: The time of kasutori, the time of the literati), Shinjuku Historical Museum (Shinjuku, Tokyo), 2009.

== Books ==
=== Books by and about Hayashi ===
- Shōsetsu no furusato (小説のふるさと, The village settings of stories). Tokyo: Chūō Kōronsha, 1957. (in Japanese)
- Karā Nihon fūkei (カラー日本風景). Kyoto: Tankō Shinsha, 1964. (in Japanese)
- Nihon no sakka: Hayashi Tadanobu shashin (日本の作家：林忠信写真). Tokyo: Shufu-to-seikatsu-sha, 1971. (in Japanese)
- Nihon no keieisha (日本の経営者). Text by Daizō Kusayanagi (草柳大蔵, Kusayanagi Daizō). Tokyo: Daiyamondo-sha, 1975. (in Japanese)
- Jinbutsu shashin (人物写真, Portrait photographs). Gendai Kamera Shinsho 50. Tokyo: Asahi Sonorama, 1978. (in Japanese) About how to photograph portraits.
- Nihon no gaka 108-nin (日本の画家108人, 108 Japanese painters). 2 vol. Tokyo: Bijutsu Shuppansha, 1978. (in Japanese) Photographs of painters and their works: a lavish, boxed production.
- Nagasaki: Umi to jūjika (長崎：海と十字架, Nagasaki: The sea and the crucifix). Nihon no Kokoro 8. Tokyo: Shūeisha, 1980. (in Japanese)
- Nihon no iemoto (日本の家元). Tokyo: Shūeisha, 1980. (in Japanese)
- Kasutori jidai: Shōwa 21 nen, Tōkyō, Nihon (カストリ時代：昭和21年、東京、日本). Tokyo: Asahi Sonorama, 1980. With an essay by Junnosuke Yoshiyuki. (in Japanese)
- Wakaki shura-tachi no sato: Chōshūji (若き修羅たちの里：長州路). Tokyo: Kōdansha, 1981. (in Japanese)
- Hayashi Tadahiko (林忠彦). Shōwa Shashin: Zenshigoto 3. Tokyo: Asahi Shinbun-sha, 1982. (in Japanese) A survey of Hayashi's work.
- Tennonzan gohyaku rakanji: Ryōjusen shaka seppō zu (天恩山五百羅漢寺：霊鷲山釈迦説法図). Tokyo: Gohyaku Rakanji, 1982. (in Japanese)
- Shashin: Saigō Takamori (写真：西郷隆盛). Tokyo: Kirihara Shoten, 1983. (in Japanese)
- Nihon no iemoto (日本の家元). Tokyo: Shūeisha, 1983. (in Japanese) On the iemoto of Japan.
- Nihon no misaki (日本の岬). Tokyo: Kirihara Shoten, 1985. (in Japanese)
- Bunshi no jidai (文士の時代, The era of literati). Tokyo: Asahi, 1986. ISBN 4-02-255483-5. (in Japanese) Black and white photographs taken much earlier.
- Chashitsu (茶室). Tokyo: Fujin Gahō, 1986. (in Japanese)
- Kasutori jidai: Renzu ga mita Shōwa nijūnendai, Tōkyō (カストリ時代：レンズが見た昭和20年代・東京, The kasutori period: 1945–55 seen by the lens, Tokyo). Asahi bunko. Tokyo: Asahi Shinbunsha, 1987. ISBN 4-02-260428-X. (in Japanese) A reworking of the book of 1980 in bunkobon (miniature) format.
- Bunshi no jidai (文士の時代). Asahi bunko. Tokyo: Asahi Shinbunsha, 1988. ISBN 4-02-260510-3. (in Japanese) A reworking of the book of 1986 in bunkobon (miniature) format.
- Ikyo Kōjitsu (異郷好日) / To Spend Pleasant Days in a Foreign Land. Tokyo: BeeBooks, 1989. (in Japanese and English)
- Tōkaidō (東海道). Tokyo: Shūeisha, 1990. ISBN 4-08-532028-9. (in Japanese) Color photographs of landscapes along the Tōkaidō.
- Hanseiki no danmen: Hayashi Tadahiko 50-nen shashin sōshūten (半世紀の断面：林忠彦50年写真総集展). Yokohama: Hayashi Tadahiko 50-nen Shashin Sōshūten Jikkō Iinkai, 1990. (in Japanese)
- Hayashi Tadahiko taidanshū: Shashin suru tabibito: Warera Kontakkusu nakama yori (林忠彦対談集写真する旅人：われらコンタックス仲間より). Tokyo: Nippon Camera, 1991. ISBN 4-8179-2012-2. (in Japanese)
- Hayashi Tadahiko shashin zenshū (林忠彦写真全集, Tadahiko Hayashi collected works). Tokyo: Heibonsha, 1992. ISBN 4-582-27725-X. (in Japanese) A large anthology of Hayashi's works.
- Sanka (讃歌). Sun Art, 1992. Photography of the works of Hiroki Oda (織田廣喜, Oda Hiroki). (in Japanese)
- Zenkoku meichashitsu annai: Itsudemo haiken dekiru: Kokuhō kara meiseki made (全国名茶室案内：いつでも拝見できる：国宝から名席まで). Tokyo: Fujin Gahō, 1993. ISBN 4-573-40008-7. (in Japanese)
- Kyō no chashitsu: Setouchi Jakuchō san to otozureru: Meisō to kataru cha no kokoro (京の茶室：報瀬戸内寂聴さんと訪れる：僧と語る茶の心). Tokyo: Fujin Gahō, 1993. ISBN 4-573-40007-9. (in Japanese) With Yoshikatsu Hayashi (the photographer's son).
- Hayashi Tadahiko no sekai: Hayashi Tadahiko no mita sengo: Kasutori, bunshi, soshite Amerika (林忠彦の世界：林忠彦の見た戦後、カストリ・文士・そしてアメリカ) / Tadahiko Hayashi. Tokyo: Tokyo Metropolitan Museum of Photography, 1993. (in Japanese and English) The Japanese title means “The world of Tadahiko Hayashi: The postwar period that Tadahiko Hayashi saw: Kasutori, literati and America”; and this excellently produced exhibition catalogue concentrates on these three areas of Hayashi's work. Captions and texts in English as well as Japanese.
- Hayashi Tadahiko (林忠彦, Tadahiko Hayashi). Nihon no Shashinka. Tokyo: Iwanami Shoten, 1998. ISBN 4-00-008365-1. (in Japanese)
- Tōkaidō no tabi: Shashinshū (東海道の旅：写真集) / Journeys along the Tokaido. Tokyo: Wedge, 2006. ISBN 4-900594-91-1. (in Japanese) Text by Yoshikatsu Hayashi (the photographer's son).
- Bunshi to shōsetsu no furusato (文士と小説のふるさと) / Bunshi. Tokyo: Pie, 2007. ISBN 978-4-89444-596-3. (in Japanese and English) A collection of photographs of writers and also photographs taken in the locations of novels. Text and comments on each photograph in Japanese only; captions and some other material also in English.
- Kasutori no jidai (カストリの時代) / Kastori. Tokyo: Pie, 2007. ISBN 978-4-89444-597-0. (in Japanese and English) Japan shortly after the end of the war. Text in Japanese only; captions also in English.
- Shinjuku, jidai no katachi: Kasutori jidai, bunshi no jidai (新宿・時代の貌 カストリ時代・文士の時代, Shinjuku, the shape of the times: The time of kasutori, the time of the literati). Tokyo: Shinjuku Historical Museum, 2009. (in Japanese) Catalogue of an exhibition.

=== Other substantial book contributions ===
- Association to Establish the Japan Peace Museum, ed. Ginza to sensō (銀座と戦争) / Ginza and the War. Tokyo: Atelier for Peace, 1986. ISBN 4-938365-04-9. Hayashi is one of ten photographers — the others are Ken Domon, Shigeo Hayashi, Kōyō Ishikawa, Kōyō Kageyama, Shunkichi Kikuchi, Ihei Kimura, Kōji Morooka, Minoru Ōki, and Maki Sekiguchi — who provide 340 photographs for this well-illustrated and large photographic history of Ginza from 1937 to 1947. Captions and text in both Japanese and English.
- (Joint work) Bunshi no shōzō hyakujūnin (文士の肖像一一〇人, "Portraits of 110 literati"). Tokyo: Asahi Shinbunsha, 1990. Hayashi is one of five photographers — the others are Shōtarō Akiyama, Ken Domon, Hiroshi Hamaya, and Ihei Kimura.
- Hiraki, Osamu, and Keiichi Takeuchi. Japan, a Self-Portrait: Photographs 1945–1964. Paris: Flammarion, 2004. ISBN 2-08-030463-1. Hayashi is one of eleven photographers whose works appear in this large book (the others are Ken Domon, Hiroshi Hamaya, Eikoh Hosoe, Yasuhiro Ishimoto, Kikuji Kawada, Ihei Kimura, Shigeichi Nagano, Ikkō Narahara, Takeyoshi Tanuma, and Shōmei Tōmatsu).
- (in Japanese) Sengo shashin / Saisei to tenkai (戦後写真・再生と展開) / Twelve Photographers in Japan, 1945–55. Yamaguchi: Yamaguchi Prefectural Museum of Art, 1990. Despite the alternative title in English, almost exclusively in Japanese (although each of the twelve has a potted chronology in English). Catalogue of an exhibition held at Yamaguchi Prefectural Museum of Art. Twenty of Hayashi's photographs of kasutori jidai appear on pp. 7–17.
- Tōkyō: Toshi no shisen (東京：都市の視線) / Tokyo: A City Perspective. Tokyo: Tokyo Metropolitan Museum of Photography, 1990. Eleven photographs from the Kasutori no jidai series appear in this lavish catalogue of an exhibition of postwar black and white photographs. Captions and text in both Japanese and English.

== Sources and external links ==
- Akiyama Shōtarō. Untitled reminiscence. P. 31 of Hayashi Tadahiko no sekai / Tadahiko Hayashi.
- "Chronology". Pp. 178–87 of Hayashi Tadahiko no sekai / Tadahiko Hayashi.
- (in Japanese) CV with chronology at Fujifilm.
- Hayashi Tadahiko no sekai: Hayashi Tadahiko no mita sengo: Kasutori, bunshi, soshite Amerika (林忠彦の世界：林忠彦の見た戦後、カストリ・文士・そしてアメリカ) / Tadahiko Hayashi. Tokyo: Tokyo Metropolitan Museum of Photography, 1993. This bilingual production is particularly informative (as well as having an excellent selection of Hayashi's earlier work, excellently reproduced).
- (in Japanese) Hayashi at the Shunan City Museum of Art and History
- (in Japanese) Photographs by Hayashi at the Shunan City Museum of Art and History
- (in Japanese) Katō Kōki (加藤功騎). Capsule review of Kasutori Jidai. P. 200. In Shashinshū o yomu: Besuto 338 kanzen gaido (写真集を読む：ベスト338完全ガイド, “Reading photobooks: A complete guide to the best 338”). Tokyo: Metarōgu, 1997. ISBN 4-8398-2010-4.
- Midorikawa Yōichi. “My Dear Friend Hayashi Tadahiko. P. 79 of Hayashi Tadahiko no sekai / Tadahiko Hayashi.
- (in French) “Le Japon des romans”: on an exhibition at Studio Equis (Paris); with sample photographs.
- Mitsuhashi Sumiyo. “Tadahiko Hayashi: A reappraisal in the light of America 1955.” pp. 7–25 of Hayashi Tadahiko no sekai / Tadahiko Hayashi.
- (in Japanese) Mitsuhashi Sumiyo (三橋純予). Hayashi Tadahiko. In Nihon shashinka jiten (日本写真家事典) / 328 Outstanding Japanese Photographers. Kyoto: Tankōsha, 2000. P. 258. ISBN 4-473-01750-8. Despite its alternative title in English, the text is all in Japanese.
- (in Japanese) Nihon no shashinka (日本の写真家) / Biographic Dictionary of Japanese Photography. Tokyo: Nichigai Associates, 2005. ISBN 4-8169-1948-1. Despite the English-language alternative title, all in Japanese.
- Ono, Philbert. “Hayashi Tadahiko” photojpn.org
- Orto, Luisa. "Hayashi Tadahiko." In Anne Wilkes Tucker, et al., The History of Japanese Photography. New Haven: Yale University Press, 2003. ISBN 0-300-09925-8.
- Ōtake Shōji. Untitled reminiscence. P. 77 of Hayashi Tadahiko no sekai / Tadahiko Hayashi.
- Saitō Kōichi. Untitled reminiscence. P. 131 of Hayashi Tadahiko no sekai / Tadahiko Hayashi.
- (in French) “Tadahiko Hayashi” at photosapiens.com
- Ueda Shōji. Untitled reminiscence. P. 129 of Hayashi Tadahiko no sekai / Tadahiko Hayashi.
