= Fukada =

Fukada (written: 深田 lit. "muddy field") is a Japanese surname. Notable people with the surname include:

- Koji Fukada (深田 晃司; born 1980), Japanese film director and screenwriter
- Kyoko Fukada (深田 恭子; born 1982), Japanese actress and singer
- Kyūya Fukada (深田 久弥; 1903–1971), Japanese writer and mountaineer
- Mari Fukada (深田 茉莉; born 2007), Japanese snowboarder
- Shiho Fukada (深田 志穂), Japanese photojournalist
- Toshio Fukada (深田 敏夫; 1928–2009), Japanese photographer
