= Kira Sugiyama =

Japanese photographer (1910–1988)

Kira Sugiyama (杉山 吉良, Sugiyama Kira; October 17, 1910 – December 12, 1988) was a Japanese photographer.

Sugiyama was born in Shizuoka prefecture. He attended Waseda Middle School but left after his parents died during the 1923 Great Kantō earthquake. In 1927 he joined Paramount News, where he learned to do photojournalism. In 1936 he published a series in a magazine depicting women moving. In 1938, Sugiyama was among the photographers involved in the Youth Reportage Photography Research Association (Seinen Hōdō Shashin Kenkyūkai), a group formed with the support of Photo Times in which Ken Domon and Hiroshi Hamaya also participated. During World War II he broadcast as a member of the Imperial Japanese Army, most notably at the battle of Attu.

After the war, Sugiyama returned to Paramount News. He then transitioned to nude photography and became a pioneer in the field. In 1953 he went to Sao Paulo, Brazil. After returning to Japan, he began exhibiting his photographs in 1969. In 1978 he went to Attu Island and later exhibited the photographs he took in remembrance of his comrades there.

Sugiyama died on December 12, 1988.
