= Shiho Fukada =

Japanese photojournalist

Shiho Fukada (深田 志穂, Fukada Shiho) is a Japanese photojournalist based between New York and Japan. Her clientele consists of The New York Times, MSNBC, Le Monde, Stern and the New York magazine, among others. She won the Grand Prize in Editor and Publisher Magazine’s Ninth Annual Photos of the Year contest in 2008. Fukada also won an Alicia Patterson Journalism Fellowship in 2010 to research and photograph Japan's disposable workers.

== Career ==
Fukada majored in English literature and first worked in fashion advertising as an account executive. She borrowed a 35 mm SLR camera and started making photos.
