= Mitsugi Kishida =

Japanese photographer (1916–1988)

Mitsugi Kishida (岸田 貢宜, Kishida Mitsugi; 1916–1988) was a Japanese photographer.

== Selected photos ==
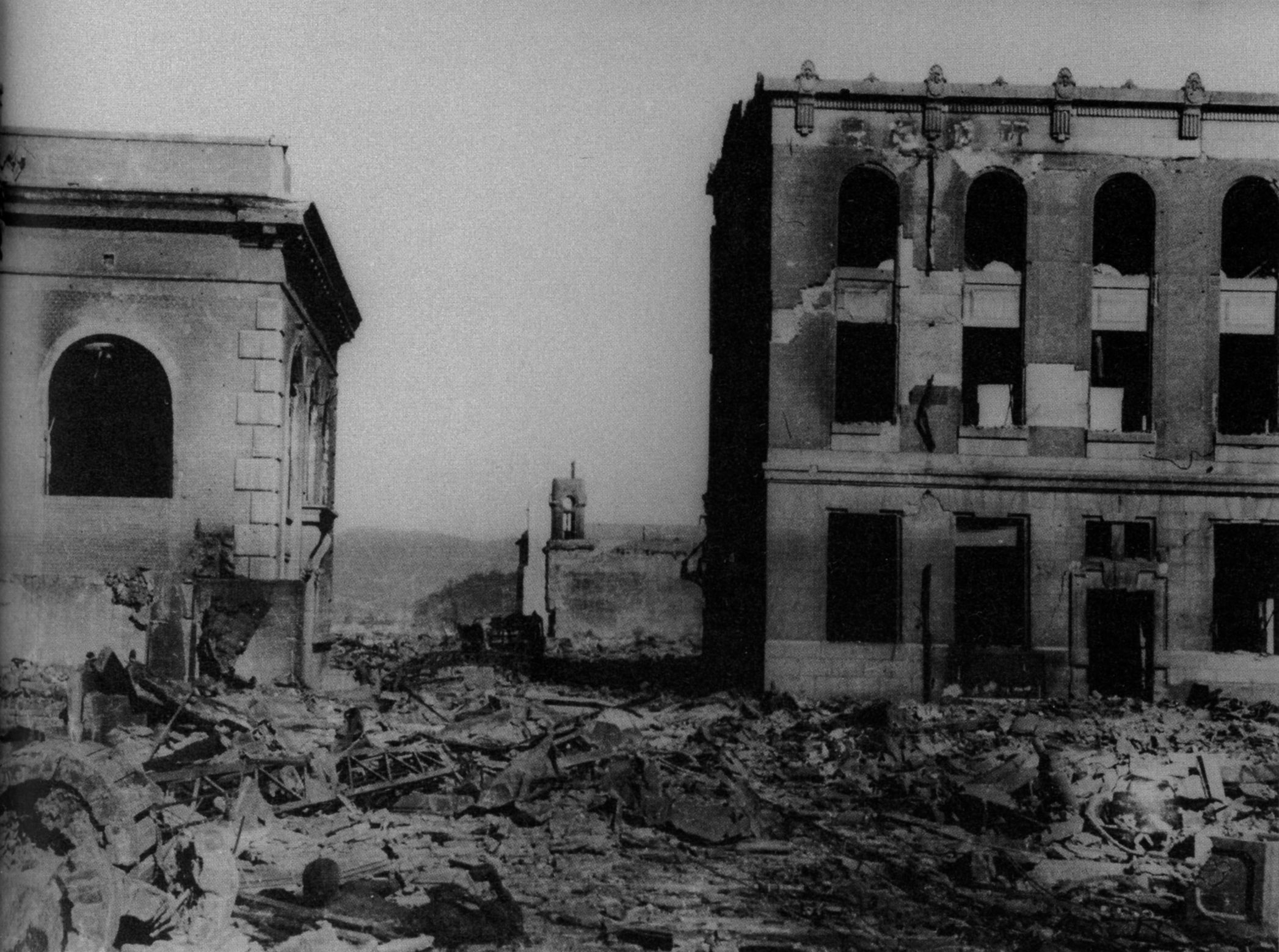
View of Hiroshima City seen from the Hondōri street, Hiroshima City on 7 August 1945

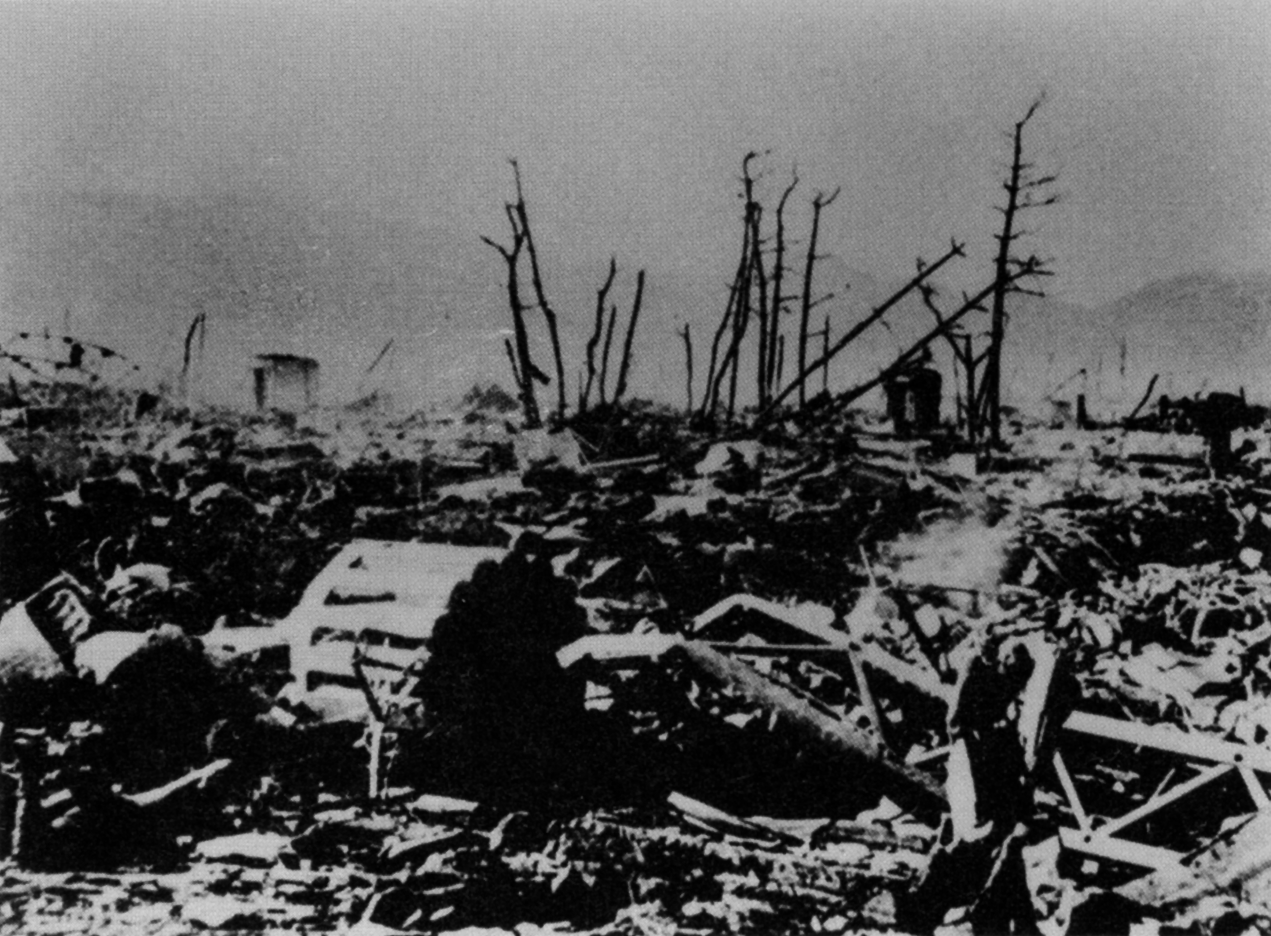
The central part of the Hondōri street Hiroshima City scattered corpses on 7 August 1945

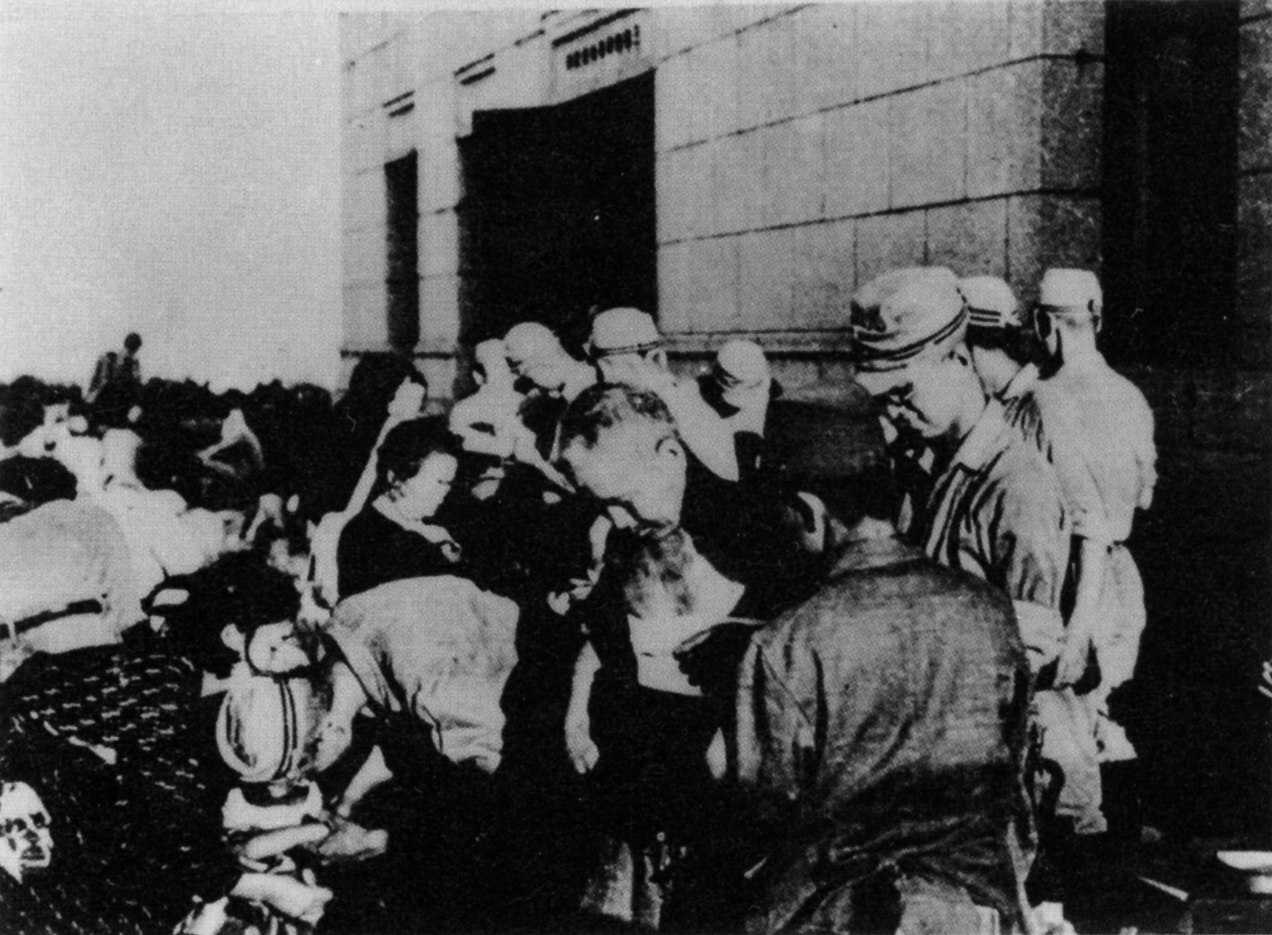
Victims receiving relief works in front of Hiroshima Credit Union HQ on 7 August 1945

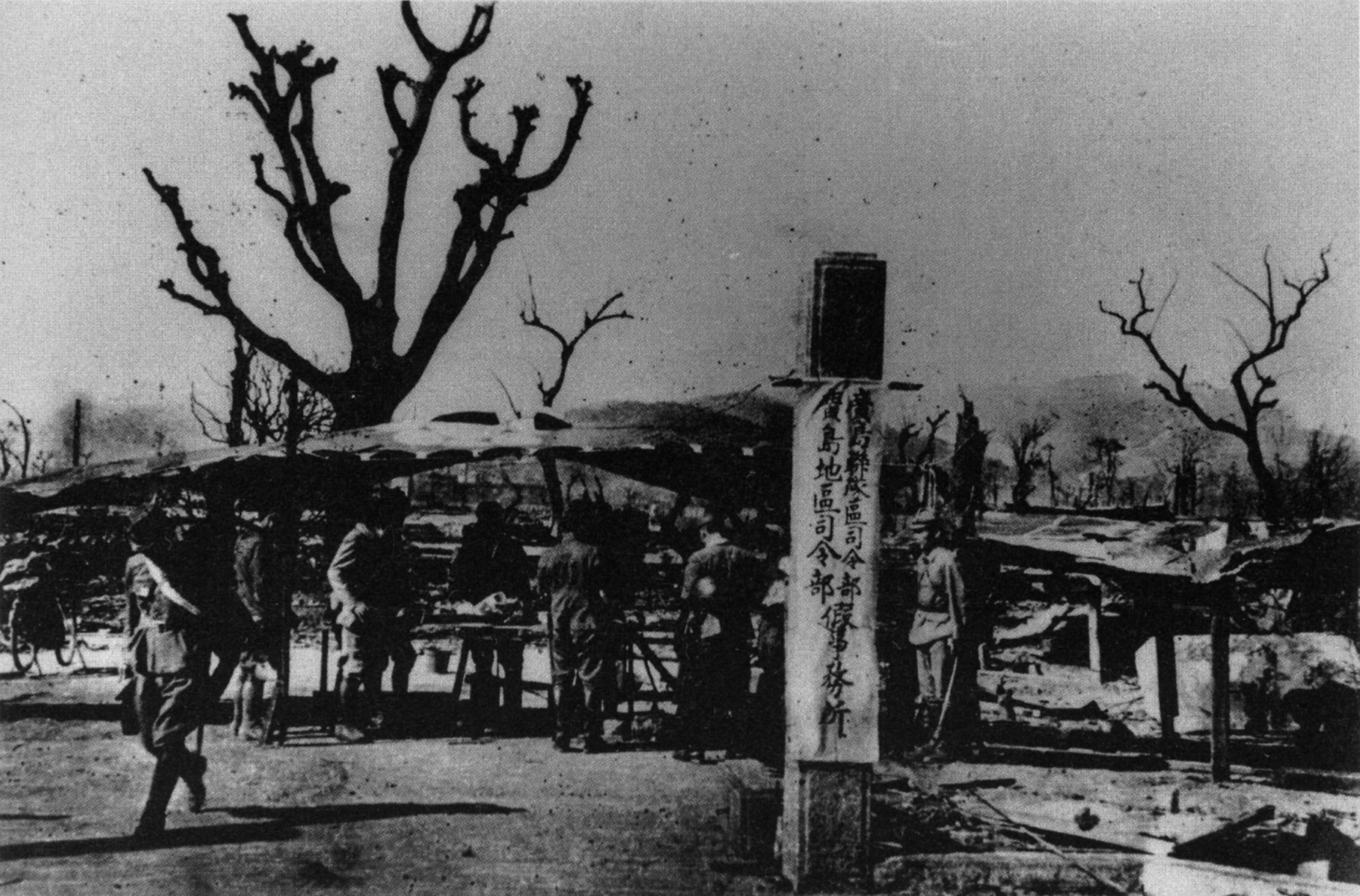
Japanese Imperial Army's temporal office built on the site of the burnt-out Hiroshima regiment HQ

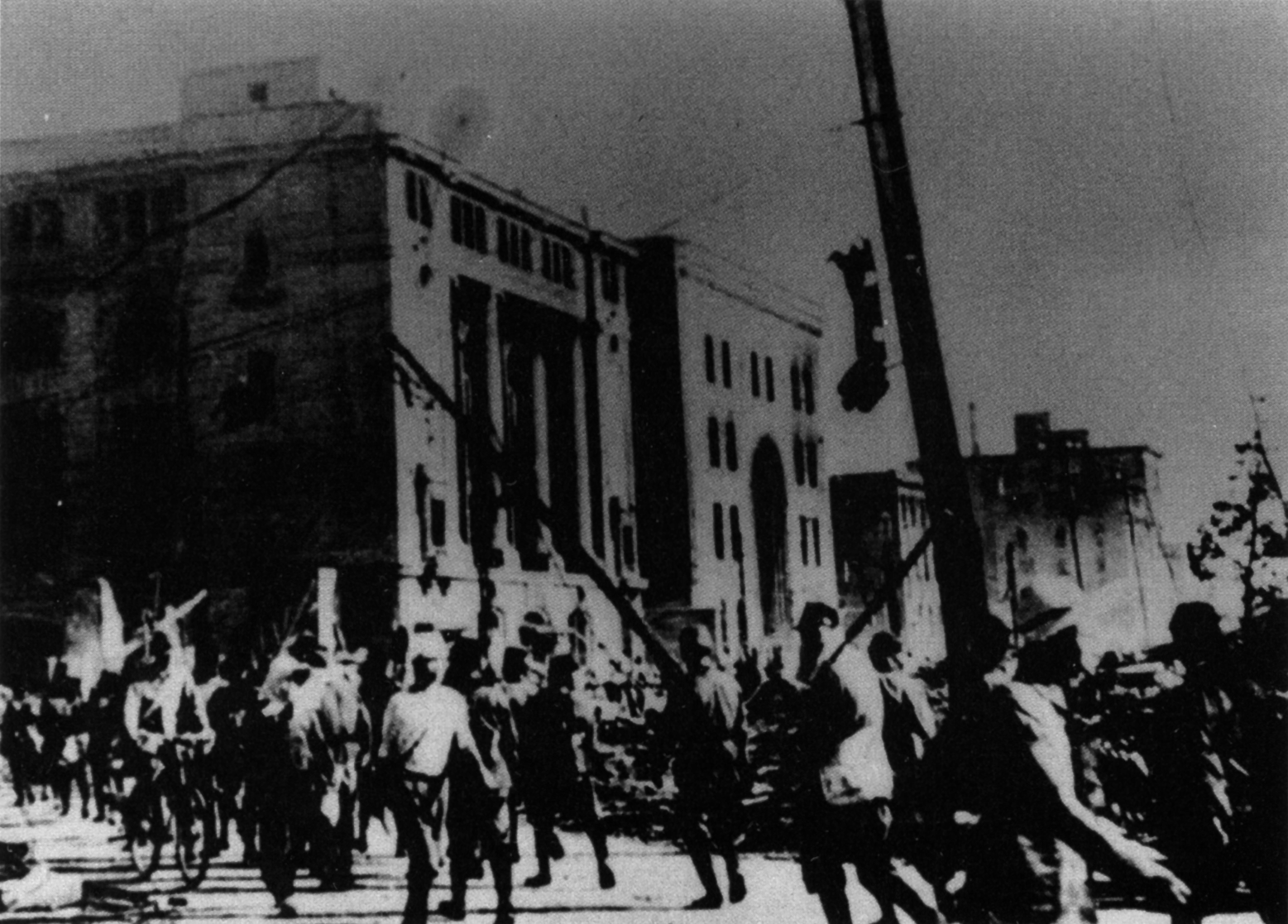
Relief team entering Hiroshima City on 9 August 1945
