= Kikujirō Fukushima =

Japanese photographer (1921–2015)

Kikujirō Fukushima (福島 菊次郎, Fukushima Kikujirō; March 15, 1921 – September 24, 2015) was a Japanese photographer and journalist, author of the book Postwar Japan that was not photographed: From Hiroshima to Fukushima.

== Early life and military service ==
Born in Kudamatsu-shi Yamaguchi Prefecture as the youngest of four brothers, his father was the head of a fisherman's union. Drafted in the spring of 1944 he worked in logistics, delivering munitions to troops by horseback in the 10th East Hiroshima Battalion. He was discharged after incurring a bone fracture from the kick of a horse during training. While under treatment his unit was torpedoed off the coast of Okinawa. He was re-drafted in spring 1945 and ordered to charge at American tanks with depth charges in preparation for Operation Downfall. He would see the end of the war in a foxhole off the coast of Kagoshima Prefecture.

== Career ==
After the war Fukushima would work repairing wristwatches and developing photographs, and later as a district welfare officer. Documenting the victims of the Hiroshima bombing over 10 years, he published the Japan Photo Critics Association award-winning photobook "Pika Don: The Memories of Atomic Bombing Victims." Badly affected by the suffering and poverty he witnessed, he started to have auditory and visual hallucinations and was diagnosed with psychasthenia. He would move to Tokyo in 1961 with his 3 children to work as a professional photographer after separating from his wife.

His work would cover post-war issues such as the Sanrizuka Struggle, environmental pollution, Zainichi Korean slums, and military rearmament as well as Middle Eastern and Soviet politics. His work would span across 17 exhibitions and 12 photobooks. In 1961, he began a year-long report on the Defense Ministry's arms manufacturing. After being granted access to a factory he covertly photographed crucial components. He was later stabbed and had his nose broken, requiring 10 stitches. One month later his house was set on fire, his daughter safely retrieving his negatives.

In 1982 he would move to an uninhabited island in the Seto Inland Sea due to his convictions of self-sufficiency. He would return to Yanai-shi, Yamaguchi prefecture after being diagnosed with stomach cancer in 1987. He would resume photography following the 2011 Fukushima Daiichi nuclear disaster.

== Film ==
The documentary film Nippon no Uso (Japan Lies—The Photojournalism of Kikujiro Fukushima, Age 90) provides insight into the life of Fukushima. Based on Fukushima's 250,000 photos and his own experiences, the film shows the little-known side of Japan's postwar path. Directed by Saburo Hasegawa and produced by Documentary Japan, the film was released on August 4, 2012, in Tokyo.

== Death ==
He died after a stroke on September 24, 2015.

== Collection of Works ==
Before his death, the rights to all of his works were transferred to Kyodo News Images in Tokyo in accordance with Kikujiro's wishes. Over 100,000 negatives have been stored and continue to be digitized.The works are available online.
