= Kenji Ishiguro =

Japanese photographer

Kenji Ishiguro (石黒 健治, Ishiguro Kenji; born 1935) is a Japanese photographer.

== Publications ==
- Hiroshima 1965. 1970.
  - Akio Nagasawa, 2018. Edition of 900 copies.
