= Eiichi Matsumoto =

Japanese photographer

Eiichi Matsumoto (松本 栄一, Matsumoto Eiichi; 1915–2004) was a Japanese photographer.

During World War II he worked as a photojournalist for the Asahi Shimbun newspaper, covering the firebombing of several Japanese cities. Following the atomic bombing of Hiroshima and Nagasaki, he was sent to photograph the aftermath.
