= Shōtarō Akiyama =

Japanese photographer (1920–2003)

Shōtarō Akiyama (秋山 庄太郎, Akiyama Shōtarō; 1920–2003) was a renowned Japanese photographer.
