= Kōji Morooka =

Japanese photographer

Kōji Morooka (師岡宏次, Morooka Kōji; 1914–1991) was a Japanese photographer.
