= Shunkichi Kikuchi =

Japanese photographer

Shunkichi Kikuchi (菊池 俊吉, Kikuchi Shunkichi; 1 May 1916 – 5 November 1990) was a Japanese photographer best known for his documentation of Hiroshima and Tokyo immediately after the war.

Kikuchi was born in Hanamaki, Iwate on 1 May 1916. After graduating from the Oriental School of Photography, Kikuchi was employed in the Photography Division of Tokyo Kōgeisha and began his career as a news photographer. In 1941 he worked in the photography division of Tōhōsha, a company established by Sōzō Okada and in 1942 was a member of the photographic staff of the magazine Front. His work took him to China, "Manchukuo" and the Philippines.

In 1945, the Ministry of Education organized the "Science Council of Japan Special Committee on the Damage Caused by the Atomic Bomb, Hiroshima/Nagasaki Survey Group", and commissioned Nippon Eiga-sha as its Documentary Film Division. Kikuchi served as a still photographer attached to the division and was hired to shoot for medical purposes. He recorded post-atomic bomb Hiroshima from 30 September to 22 October 1945. In November he was back photographing Tokyo, particularly a home for vagrant children.

Kikuchi also helped establish a new magazine where he became involved in scientific photography for the first time.

From 1951 Kikuchi's photographs were published in such prominent magazines as Sekai, Chūōkōron, and Fujin Kōron.

Kikuchi died on 5 November 1990 aged 74 from leukemia, which many have attributed to his extensive work in irradiated Hiroshima.

== Books with works by Kikuchi ==
- Yūenchi (ゆうえんち). Tokyo: Toppan, 1954.
- Kikaika butai no shuryoku sensha (機械化部隊の主力戦車). Rikugun Shashinshū. Tokyo: Green Arrow, 1994. ISBN 4-7663-3158-3.
- Association to Establish the Japan Peace Museum, ed. Ginza to sensō (銀座と戦争) / Ginza and the War. Tokyo: Atelier for Peace, 1986. ISBN 4-938365-04-9. Kikuchi is one of ten photographers who provide 340 photographs for this well-illustrated and large photographic history of Ginza from 1937 to 1947. Captions and text in both Japanese and English.
- Hiroshima: Sensō to toshi (広島：戦争と都市). Tokyo: Iwanami, 1987. ISBN 4-00-003522-3.
- Kaku: Hangenki (核：半減期) / The Half Life of Awareness: Photographs of Hiroshima and Nagasaki. Tokyo: Tokyo Metropolitan Museum of Photography, 1995. Exhibition catalogue; captions and text in both Japanese and English. Nine photographs by Kikuchi of medical treatment in Hiroshima are reproduced. Text and captions in both Japanese and English.
- (in Japanese) Shashinka wa nani o hyōgen shita ka: 1945–1960 (写真家はなにを表現したか1945～1960, What were photographers expressing: 1945–1960). Tokyo: Konica Plaza, 1991. Pp. 16–17.
- (with Ihei Kimura, Kiyoshi Sonobe and others) Tōkyō sen-kyūhyaku-yonjūgonen, aki (東京一九四五年・秋) / Tokyo: Fall of 1945. Tokyo: Bunka-sha, 1946. A stapled booklet of sepia photographs of life in Tokyo immediately after the end of the war. (The word aki in the title makes it clear that fall here means autumn, not defeat.) Text and captions in both Japanese and English.
- Tōkyō: Toshi no shisen (東京：都市の視線) / Tokyo: A city perspective. Tokyo: Tokyo Metropolitan Museum of Photography, 1990. Includes two photographs of Tokyo taken immediately after the war. Text and captions in both Japanese and English.
