= Toshio Fukada =

Japanese photographer (1928–2009)

Toshio Fukada (深田 敏夫, Fukada Toshio; 1928–2009) was a Japanese photographer. Fukada died in 2009.
