= Shigeo Hayashi =

Japanese photographer

- Born: 1918
- Died: 2002 (aged 83–84)

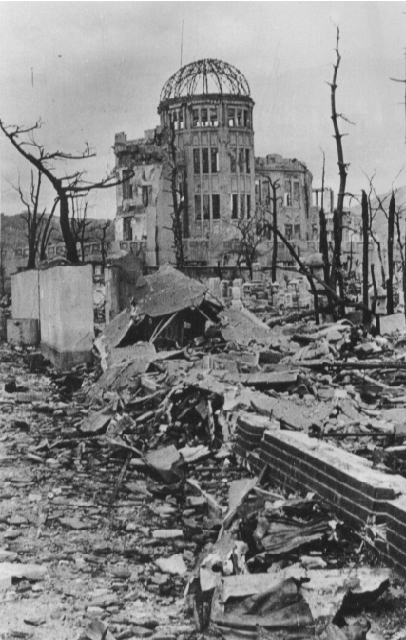
The Genbaku Dome amidst the devastation in October 1945. Photograph by Shigeo Hayashi, one of two photographers attached to the academic survey teams.

Shigeo Hayashi (林 重男, Hayashi Shigeo; 1918–2002) was a Japanese photographer. After three years of Army service he began his career as a photographer with the Japanese propaganda magazine FRONT, in 1943. In September 1945 he was one of two photographers assigned by the Special Committee for the Investigation of A-bomb Damage to document the aftermath of the Atomic bombings of Hiroshima and Nagasaki. In subsequent decades he worked as a commercial photographer. He died in 2002 at the age of 84.
