= First Collection 2006–2009 =

Compilation album by Fleet Foxes
- Released: November 9, 2018
- Genre: Indie folk
- Labels: Nonesuch; Sub Pop
- Producer: Phil Ek

Fleet Foxes chronology
Crack-Up (2017)	First Collection 2006–2009 (2018)	Shore (2020)

Professional ratings
Aggregate scores
Source	Rating
Metacritic	89/100
Review scores
Source	Rating
musicOMH	5/5
Paste	7.7/10
Pitchfork	8.1/10
Under the Radar	9/10 stars

First Collection 2006–2009 is a Fleet Foxes compilation, released on 9 November 2018 to mark the tenth anniversary of their debut album. It is a special limited-edition collection.

== Track listing ==
=== Disc one: Fleet Foxes ===
All tracks are written by Robin Pecknold.

No.	Title	Length
1.	"Sun It Rises"	3:14
2.	"White Winter Hymnal"	2:27
3.	"Ragged Wood"	5:07
4.	"Tiger Mountain Peasant Song"	3:28
5.	"Quiet Houses"	3:32
6.	"He Doesn't Know Why"	3:20
7.	"Heard Them Stirring"	3:02
8.	"Your Protector"	4:09
9.	"Meadowlarks"	3:11
10.	"Blue Ridge Mountains"	4:25
11.	"Oliver James"	3:23

=== Disc two: Sun Giant EP ===
All tracks are written by Robin Pecknold.

No.	Title	Length
1.	"Sun Giant"	2:14
2.	"Drops in the River"	4:13
3.	"English House"	4:41
4.	"Mykonos"	4:35
5.	"Innocent Son"	3:07
Total length:		18:50

=== Disc three: Fleet Foxes EP ===
All tracks are written by Robin Pecknold.

No.	Title	Length
1.	"She Got Dressed"	3:29
2.	"In the Hot Hot Rays"	3:04
3.	"Anyone Who's Anyone"	3:50
4.	"Textbook Love"	3:25
5.	"So Long to the Headstrong"	4:16
6.	"Icicle Tusk"	4:38
Total length:		22:42

=== Disc four: B-Sides & Rarities ===
No.	Title	Length
1.	"False Knight on the Road" (traditional)	3:45
2.	"Silver Dagger" (traditional)	3:19
3.	"White Lace Regretfully"	2:32
4.	"Isles"	3:07
5.	"Ragged Wood" (transition basement sketch)	1:48
6.	"He Doesn't Know Why" (basement demo)	3:15
7.	"English House" (basement demo)	4:00
8.	"Hot Air" (basement sketch)	0:49
Total length:		22:35

== Personnel ==
=== Fleet Foxes ===
Fleet Foxes

- Robin Pecknold – band member, songwriter, arranger, design (uncredited: lead vocals, guitar)
- Skyler Skjelset – band member, arranger (uncredited: lead guitar)
- Nicholas Peterson – band member, arranger (uncredited: drums, percussion, vocals)
- Casey Wescott – band member, arranger (uncredited: keyboards, vocals)
- Craig Curran – band member, arranger (uncredited: bass, vocals)

Additional instrumental personnel

- Gwen Owen – flute on "Your Protector"

Production personnel

- Phil Ek – producer, engineer, mixer
- Monica Nelson - graphic designer

=== Sun Giant ===
The liner notes state that: "We all played many an instrument. An itemized and individualized list would be egotistical and tiresome"

- Robin Pecknold – [lead] vocals, various instruments [uncredited: guitar]
- Skyler Skjelset – various instruments [uncredited: lead guitar, mandolin, vocals]
- Casey Wescott – various instruments [uncredited: piano, keyboards, vocals]
- Christian Wargo – various instruments [uncredited: bass, guitar, vocals]
- Nicholas Peterson – various instruments [uncredited: drums, percussion, vocals]

Production personnel

- Phil Ek – producer, engineer, mixer

Mastering personnel

- Ed Brooks – mastering

== Charts ==
Chart performance for First Collection 2006–2009
Chart (2018)	Peak position
US Top Current Album Sales (Billboard)	96
