= Shore (album) =

Studio album by Fleet Foxes
- Released: September 22, 2020
- Recorded: September 2019–September 2020
- Studios: The Long Pond (Columbia County, New York); Studios St Germain (Paris); Vox (Los Angeles); The Diamond Mine (New York City); Electric Lady (New York City)
- Genres: Indie folk; chamber pop; folk rock; indie rock
- Length: 54:22
- Label: Anti-
- Producer: Robin Pecknold

Fleet Foxes chronology
Crack-Up (2017)	Shore (2020)	A Very Lonely Solstice (2021)

Shore is the fourth studio album by American band Fleet Foxes, released on September 22, 2020, by Anti- Records.

It was announced one day in advance of its release, and was intentionally released exactly at the autumnal equinox on September 22, 2020. It is the follow-up to their 2017 album Crack-Up and is the band's first release on Anti- Records. It is the band's second album since regrouping in 2016 after a three-year hiatus.

Frontman Robin Pecknold began writing Shore in September 2018 and recorded the album between September 2019 and September 2020, including during the COVID-19 pandemic. Pecknold produced the album, working alongside recording and mixing engineer Beatriz Artola. It was made by Pecknold without the other members of the band and features a "brighter" sound than their previous work. Shore features a number of collaborators, including other vocalists. Pecknold has called the album a celebration of "life in the face of death".

Shore received widespread acclaim from music critics and appeared on several year-end lists. It was nominated for Best Alternative Music Album at the 64th Annual Grammy Awards.

== Background ==
A fourth Fleet Foxes album was first mentioned in December 2016 by frontman Robin Pecknold, three months before the announcement of their third studio album Crack-Up (2017). Pecknold claimed that Fleet Foxes was contractually obligated to release another album "within 24 months" of their third album. However, Pecknold clarified that a fourth album had not been written yet and that he was in the process of writing a solo album. Days before the release of Crack-Up, Pecknold teased a fourth album titled Gioia. Crack-Up was released by Nonesuch Records on June 16, 2017. Around the same time, Pecknold stated that he wanted the band's fourth album to have a "joyous" and "ecstatic" sound. He described Crack-Up as beginning in "pure conflicted solitude" and ending in a "bright clearing", and said he wanted their next album to be a "celebration of or elaboration on how Crack-Up ends."

Fleet Foxes embarked on an extensive tour in support of Crack-Up, playing upwards of 170 shows. The tour concluded with a performance at the 2018 Bumbershoot festival in Seattle on September 2, 2018.

== Writing and recording ==
"I wanted the album to exist in a liminal space outside of time, inhabiting both the future and the past, accessing something spiritual or personal that is untouchable by whatever the state of the world may be at a given moment, whatever our season."

— Robin Pecknold

Pecknold began writing Shore in September 2018, immediately after touring Crack-Up. He wanted to find a "new, brighter way" of writing songs. He created playlists of hundreds of "warm" songs, immersing himself in the music of Arthur Russell, Curtis Mayfield, Nina Simone, Michael Nau, Van Morrison, Sam Cooke, The Roches, João Gilberto, Piero Piccioni, Tim Bernardes, Tim Maia, Jai Paul, and Emahoy Tsegué-Maryam Guèbrou. Pecknold set out to be productive and avoid another long break between albums, and wrote every day to develop compositions and a musical concept. He wanted to write an album that would celebrate "life in the face of death" and honor musical heroes that have died, explicitly referencing them in the lyrics and "carrying them" in the music. He wanted the album to "exist in a liminal space outside of time" and to provide a sense of relief from some immediate uncertainty. Pecknold wrote consistently for a year, including during a month-long writing trip in rural Portugal.

Recording began in September 2019 at Aaron Dessner's Long Pond studio located outside of Hudson, New York. It was Pecknold's first time working with recording and mixing engineer Beatriz Artola. She would go on to record the entirety of the album with Pecknold, being present at every recording session. It was Pecknold's first time working alongside a collaborator for an entire album's recording process. At Long Pond, he also worked with The Westerlies, a horn quartet composed of Andy Clausen, Chloe Rowlands, Riley Mulherkar, and Willem de Koch. They contributed horn arrangements and performances to Pecknold's songs, which were half-formed sketches at the time. Drummer Joshua Jaeger also assisted in arranging rhythms for the songs at the Long Pond session in September 2019. In October 2019, Pecknold and Artola recorded a short session at Studios St Germain in Paris, France. Pecknold enlisted Uwade Akhere, who he discovered after being sent a clip of her singing Fleet Foxes' "Mykonos". Akhere was a Columbia University student studying abroad at Oxford at the time and she traveled by train to Paris to record vocals. Her vocals appear on "Wading in Waist-High Water", "Can I Believe You", and "Shore". Between November 2019 and March 2020, Pecknold and Artola recorded at Woody Jackson's Electro-Vox Studio in Los Angeles California. Pecknold visited Vox years earlier and wanted to record there, and ended up recording most of Shore at Vox. He credits his time at Vox as well as their equipment and instruments for shaping the album's sound. Instruments they were afforded use of at Vox included an extensive collection of various guitar and bass models, Baldwin electric harpsichords, treated congas, a prototype Orchestron, taiko drums, Mahayana temple blocks, and a vibraphone played on The Beach Boys' album Pet Sounds, as well as an organ belonging to Fela Kuti and a drum kit belonging to Frank Sinatra. They also spent two weeks at Vox recording with Christopher Bear of Grizzly Bear, who contributes drums and percussion on most of the album.

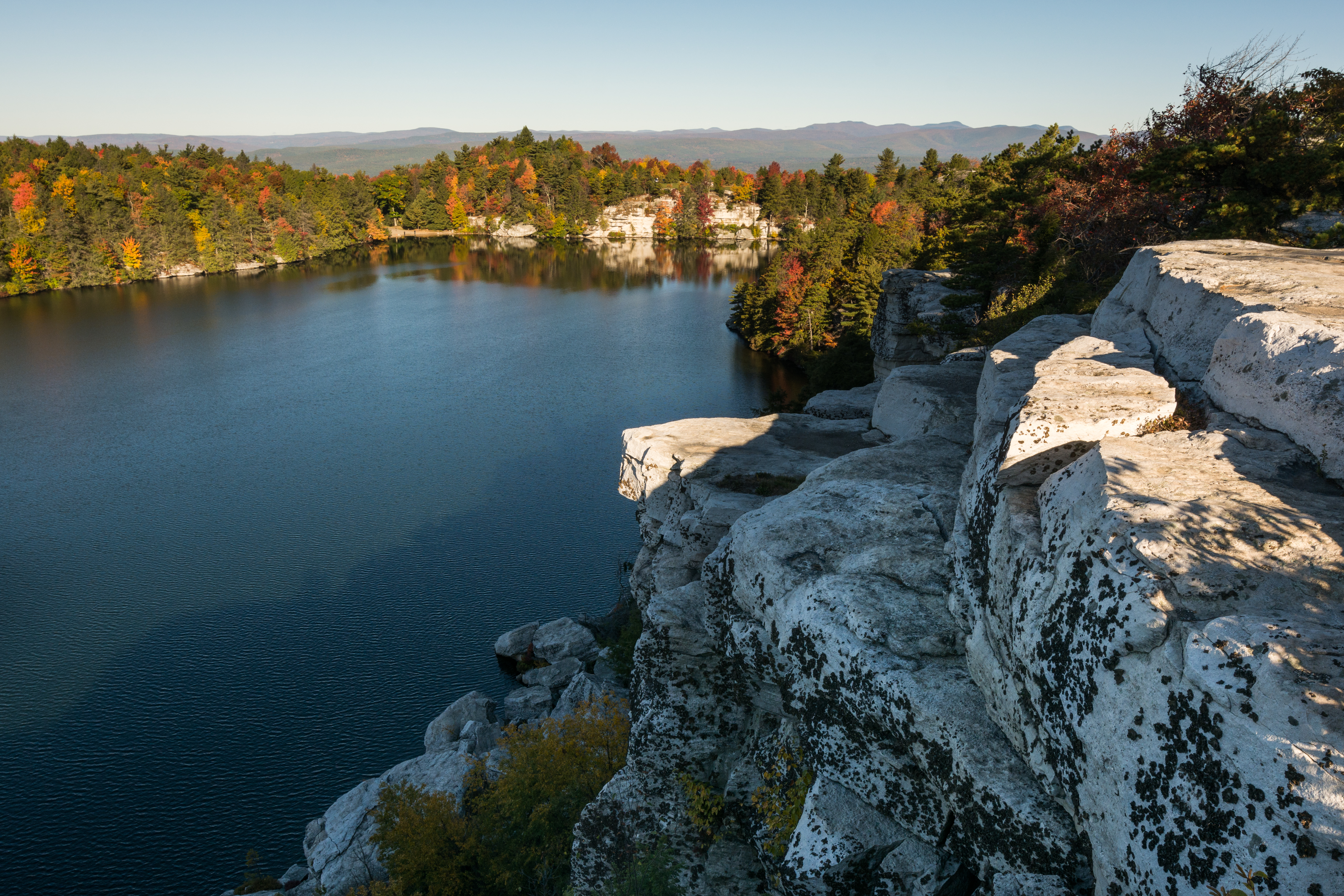
Pecknold had a breakthrough in writing lyrics while traveling back and forth to Upstate New York, including to Lake Minnewaska (pictured).

Toward the end of February 2020, Pecknold had the majority of Shore conceptualized and the contributions from other artists recorded, but he had yet to write any lyrics he felt comfortable with. He became overwhelmed with worry and anxiety about finishing the album. He would write sets of lyrics only to discard them, struggling to find the perspective he believed would match the music. Many of the songs were musically complete, but others were unfinished or uncertain. Recording at Vox was prematurely cut short due to the COVID-19 pandemic. Pecknold flew back to New York City in anticipation of a lockdown, leaving all of his guitars at Vox. He also returned to New York because Artola, who lives in New York, would be unable to travel with him to any studios during a lockdown. For three months, Pecknold quarantined in his Greenwich Village apartment due to Governor Andrew Cuomo's stay-at-home order. He also participated in the George Floyd protests in New York City. In June 2020, he began taking day-long drives in his Toyota 4Runner from his apartment in New York up to Lake Minnewaska and into the Catskill Mountains. It was during these drives that he found himself finally writing lyrics he felt comfortable with, reciting them into his phone and jotting them down in parking lots. He ultimately wrote the lyrics to fifteen songs within three to four weeks. Pecknold credits the COVID-19 pandemic and its surrounding circumstances with causing his anxiety around the album to disappear, allowing him to finish the album and giving him "a different perspective on how important or not this music was in the grand scheme of things."

Between July 2020 and August 2020, Pecknold and Artola recorded at The Diamond Mine, a recording studio Long Island City, Queens. It was there that Pecknold met Homer Steinweiss and Paul Spring of the band Holy Hive. Steinweiss contributed drums to four songs on the album and Spring acted as an additional mix engineer. Pecknold and Artola also recorded vocals and overdubs at Electric Lady Studios in Greenwich Village in August 2020. The album was produced entirely by Pecknold and mixed by Artola. Shore was made without the other members of Fleet Foxes: Skyler Skjelset, Casey Wescott, Christian Wargo, and Morgan Henderson. Pecknold expected to record with the band but did not due to the pandemic lockdown as well as his desire to finish the album and quickly release it. "Going-to-the-Sun Road" features an outro verse in Portuguese written and sung by Brazilian singer Tim Bernardes of the band O Terno, making it the first original Fleet Foxes song to not be written solely by Pecknold.

== Music and lyrics ==
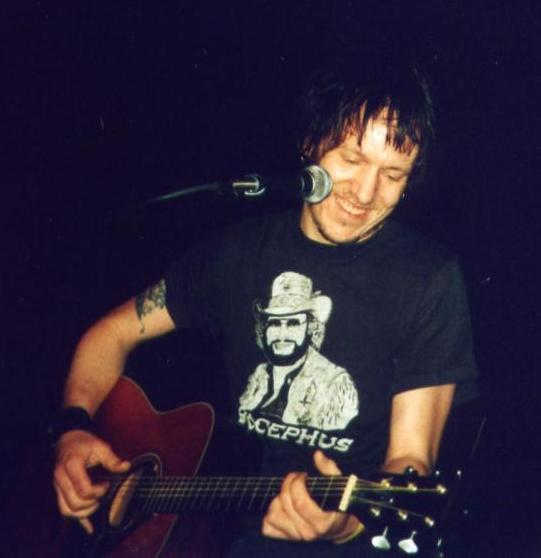
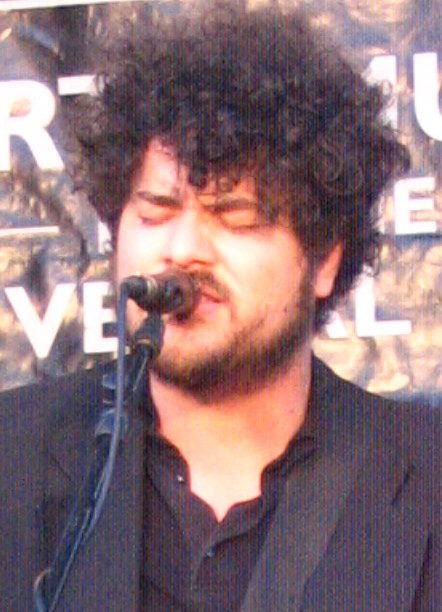
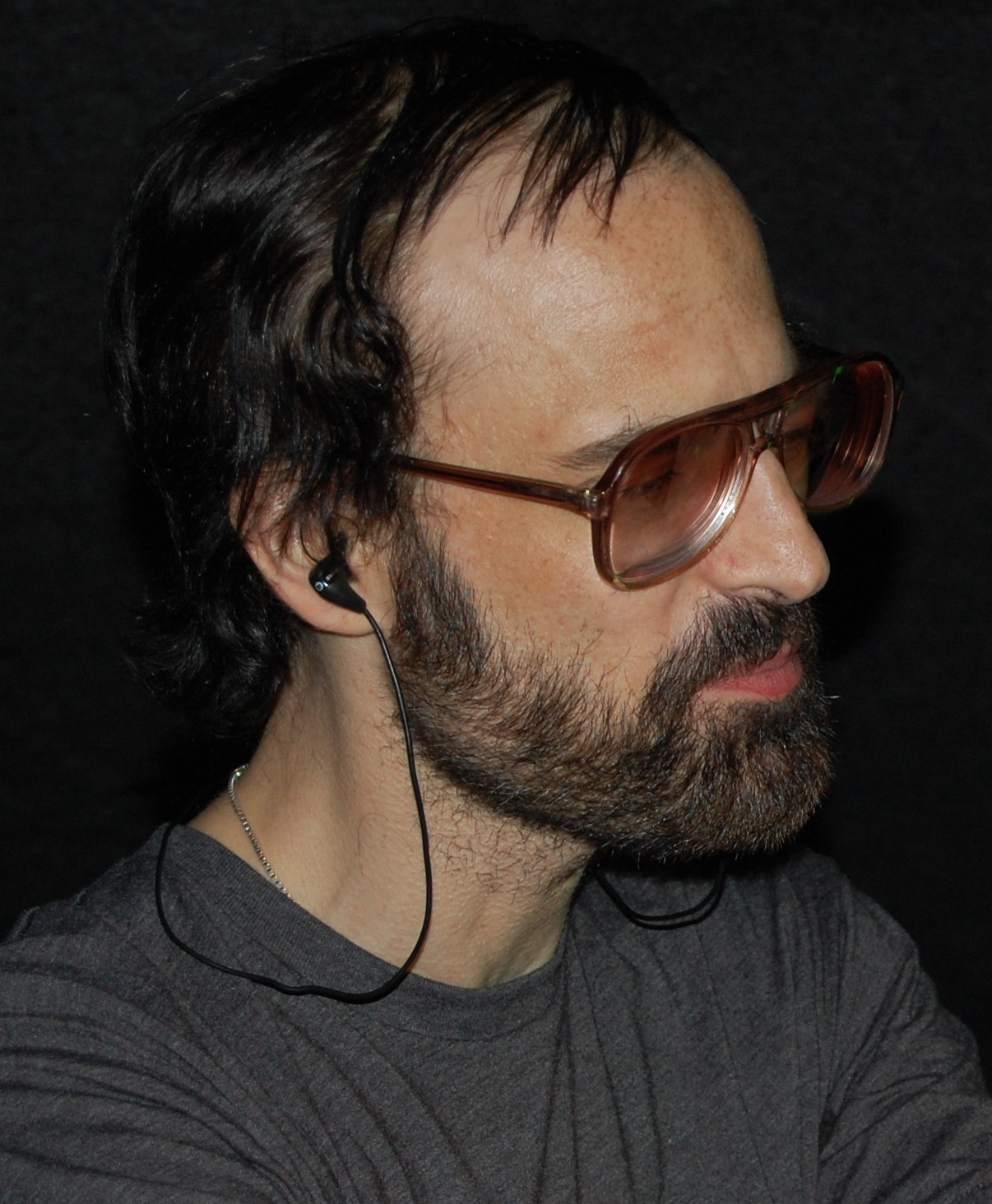
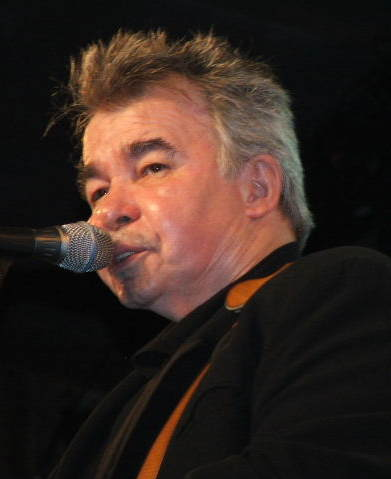
The lyrics of "Sunblind" reference musicians who have died, including (clockwise from top left) Elliott Smith, Richard Swift, John Prine, and David Berman.

Will Hodgkinson of The Times characterized the album's mood as similar to the Portuguese and Brazilian emotion of saudade, a "kind of wistfulness containing sadness and hope in equal measures". Pecknold described the album as having a yin and yang relationship with Crack-Up.

Pecknold has called Shore his least personal album, written with a focus on other people. The lyrics of "Sunblind" reference Pecknold's musical heroes who have died, including Richard Swift, Bill Withers, John Prine, Elliott Smith, Arthur Russell, Judee Sill, David Berman, Nick Drake, Otis Redding, Jeff Buckley, Curtis Mayfield, and Jimi Hendrix. In its chorus, Pecknold expresses gratitude for being alive and pledges to use the inspiration the artists have given him to live a full life in honor of their deaths. Human memory is a prevalent theme on the album, including how musicians "stay alive" through the memories people attach to their music. Pecknold was partly influenced by his grandfather who had a stroke while he was making the album, and suffered lapses in his memory.

The chorus of "Can I Believe You" features approximately 400 to 500 voices compiled from recordings solicited by Pecknold from his Instagram followers.

"Jara" is titled after the Chilean singer and political activist Victor Jara, who was tortured and killed during the dictatorship of Augusto Pinochet. It was written by Pecknold to venerate friends of his who are political activists.

"Cradling Mother, Cradling Woman" contains a sample of Brian Wilson of The Beach Boys counting, taken from an a cappella version of "Don't Talk (Put Your Head on My Shoulder)" from The Pet Sounds Sessions in which Wilson layers vocal harmonies. Pecknold first heard the outtake as a teenager and was strongly influenced by it, saying "that piece of music, more than any other, was what made me want to be a musician." "Cradling Mother, Cradling Woman" features the most overdubs of all Fleet Foxes songs.

== Artwork and title ==
The album's front cover photo is "Outlet, Bering Glacier, Alaska 1973" by Hiroshi Hamaya. The back cover photo is "Rivulet Flowing Among Trees, Akan, Hokkaidō, Japan 1964" by Hiroshi Hamaya. The gatefold photo is a still from Shore by Kersti Jan Werdal. The packaging contains hand drawn flora by visual artist Dino Matt.

The album's title is a reference to a traumatic surfing experience Pecknold had in California in 2017 when he got caught in a rip current. The relief of returning to shore influenced him to name the album Shore and decide on a "relieving, joyous, glad-to-be-alive kind of vibe" for the album.

== Release ==
On December 31, 2018, Pecknold teased several demos of new music on his Instagram. In September 2019, Pecknold posted a tracklist for a project titled Shore, which included 15 partially whited-out song titles. In December 2019, Pecknold alluded to "15 Big Ones" when asked if he would be releasing new material soon.

On August 15, 2020, Pecknold debuted "Featherweight" in a performance as part of Vote Ready Live, a livestream event encouraging voter registration.

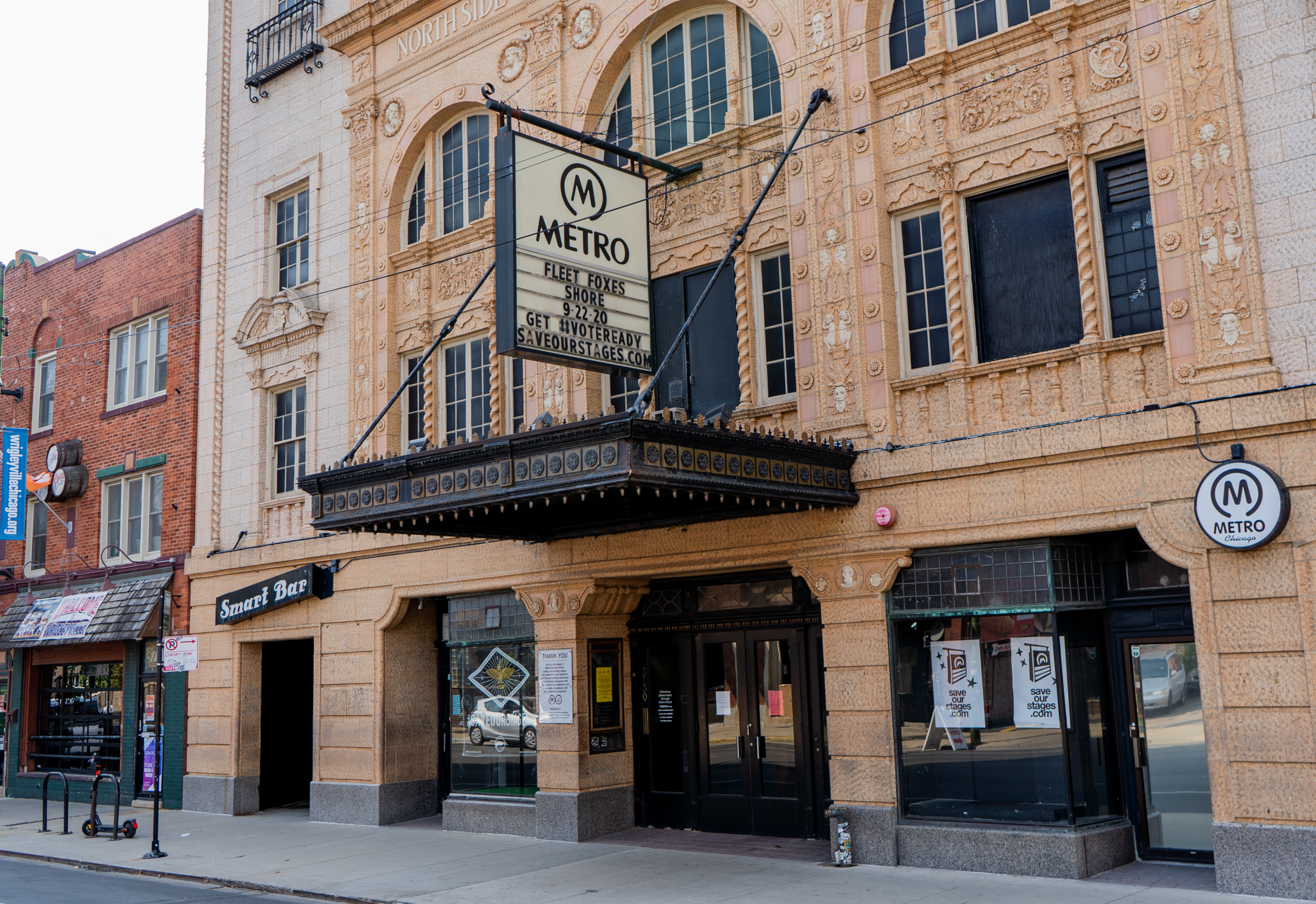
Shore promoted on the marquee of Metro Chicago in Chicago, Illinois.

On September 20, 2020, the album was teased in Paris with posters indicating a project titled Shore would be released on September 22, 2020. A teaser video was posted the same day. Pecknold confirmed via the band's Discord channel that Shore was an album and revealed that it would feature contributions from Grizzly Bear guitarist and vocalist Daniel Rossen. The album was officially announced the following day. Shore was released by Anti- on September 22, 2020, exactly at 13:31 UTC to coincide with the September equinox. A 55-minute companion film of the same title was released on YouTube at the same time. Directed by Kersti Jan Werdal and shot on Super-16mm, the film showcases landscapes of the Pacific Northwest. Before signing with Anti-, Pecknold considered self-releasing Shore on Bandcamp. Shore was also promoted on the marquees of numerous venues in the United States, including the Paramount Theatre in Seattle, the Paradise Rock Club in Boston, Webster Hall in New York, Crystal Ballroom in Portland, Oregon, and the Hollywood Palladium in Los Angeles. The marquees also encouraged people to vote.

In an interview with Exclaim!, Pecknold referred to Shore as the "Rising Quarter Phase". He stated that he planned to release nine other companion songs co-written with the other four members of Fleet Foxes. The new songs would potentially be added to an expanded tracklisting of Shore, sequenced as a 24-track album with each song assigned to an hour of the day.

On October 7, 2020, a music video for "Can I Believe You" directed by Sean Pecknold was released. It features Jade-Lorna Sullivan, who previously appeared in Sean Pecknold's music video for "Fool's Errand". It also features Jean Charles, who previously appeared in Sean Pecknold's music video for "I Am All That I Need / Arroyo Seco / Thumbprint Scar". It is the third part of the three-part trilogy.

On December 4, 2020, Fleet Foxes released the album Shore (Stems Edition) on Bandcamp. It is a collection of stems for the album, spread across 201 tracks and a duration of over eleven hours.

Physical editions of Shore were released on February 5, 2021.

On September 22, 2021, a music video for "Featherweight", directed by Sean Pecknold and animated by Eileen Kohlhepp, was released.

=== A Very Lonely Solstice ===
A virtual, pre-recorded concert performance entitled A Very Lonely Solstice was livestreamed at 9 pm ET on December 21, 2020, coinciding with the winter solstice. The concert features Pecknold performing an acoustic solo set inside the St. Ann & the Holy Trinity Church in Brooklyn. It begins with a performance of "Wading in Waist-High Water" featuring the Resistance Revival Chorus, a collective of women and nonbinary singers. It features performances of songs from Shore and older Fleet Foxes songs, as well as cover versions of the traditional folk ballad "Silver Dagger" and the Bee Gees song "In the Morning". A Very Lonely Solstice is dedicated to Sam Jayne of the band Love as Laughter.

On December 6, 2021, Fleet Foxes announced a digital release of the live album A Very Lonely Solstice for December 10, 2021. Vinyl and CD releases are scheduled for release in spring 2022 through Anti-.

== Critical reception ==
Professional ratings
Aggregate scores
Source	Rating
AnyDecentMusic?	7.9/10
Metacritic	87/100
Review scores
Source	Rating
AllMusic	4/5 stars
Clash	8/10
Consequence of Sound	B
Mojo	5/5 stars
NME	4/5 stars
The Observer	4/5 stars
Pitchfork	8.3/10
Rolling Stone	4/5 stars
The Times	5/5 stars
Uncut	9/10

At Metacritic, which assigns a normalized rating out of 100 to reviews from mainstream critics, Shore received an average score of 87 based on 19 reviews, indicating "universal acclaim".

In the review for AllMusic, Timothy Monger praised the album: "As a collection, Shore emits a sense of coming through something and arriving anew with the welcome bruises that foster greater understanding and compassion." Matthew Strauss of Pitchfork wrote that the album "looks to the world and realizes there is already enough, as if staring into a darkness and responding with beauty, acceptance, and light." James McNair of Mojo rated the album 5 out of 5 stars, writing, "The vital spark that graced Fleet Foxes' debut is back." Writing for The Observer, Kitty Empire was also similar in praise, writing, "Shore is full of richly embroidered gratitude; the play of the seasons and the influence of the elements is ever-present." Will Hodgkinson of The Times gave the album a perfect score, writing "there's not a bad song among the 15 of them." Michael Bonner of Uncut praised Pecknold's "soaring harmonies and jubilant, wide-open melodies." Steven Johnson of musicOMH rated the album 5 out of 5 stars, calling it a "future classic" and commending Pecknold's "move to the centreground that shows his absorbing of musical influences is paying rich dividends."

Jon Dolan of Rolling Stone called it "uniquely ambitious" while also the band's "catchiest" album to date, writing that the songs "compact their expansiveness into immediate pop packages" to underscore the album's theme of fighting "misery and doubt" through "simple human connection." Robin Murray at Clash also commended the album, praising "how natural, how unhurried everything is" and called it "a broad record of real depth that contains moments of striking beauty." Matt Bobkin of Exclaim! wrote, "No longer do they sound burdened by the need to commit to a particular mood; Pecknold sounds freer than ever to be himself." Writing for Consequence of Sound, Lindsay Teske commended Pecknold's "thoughtful and openhearted" lyrics and praised the album's musical subtleties for making it a "conglomerate of detail" with rewarding discovery. In a 5/10 review for Loud and Quiet, Tristan Gatward called the album "quickly stifled each time a redeeming chorus comes around" and wrote, "In a career first, Pecknold's lyrics feel rushed and insular, like we're watching smoke particles bounce around a small plastic container looking for the breathing hole."

=== Year-end lists ===
Year-end lists for Shore
Publication	List	Rank	Ref.
BBC Radio 6 Music	Albums of the Year 2020	3	
Clash	Albums of the Year 2020	34	
Double J	The 50 best albums of 2020	25	
Exclaim!	50 Best Albums of 2020	49	
Consequence of Sound	Top 50 Albums of 2020	32	
The Guardian	The 50 best albums of 2020	30	
The Line of Best Fit	The Best Albums of 2020	29	
Mojo	The 75 Best Albums of 2020	5	
musicOMH	Top 50 Albums of 2020	16	
NBHAP	50 Best Albums of 2020	21	
Noisey	The 100 Best Albums of 2020	17	
Paste	The 50 Best Albums of 2020	27	
Pitchfork	The 50 Best Albums of 2020	20	
PopMatters	The 60 Best Albums of 2020	23	
Rolling Stone	The 50 Best Albums of 2020	17	
Spin	The 30 Best Albums of 2020	10	
Stereogum	The 50 Best Albums of 2020	14	
Uncut	The Top 75 Albums of the Year	2	
Under the Radar	Top 100 Albums of 2020	8	
Uproxx	The Best Albums of 2020	12	
USA Today	The 10 best albums of 2020	7	

== Track listing ==
All lyrics are written by Robin Pecknold, except lyrics in Portuguese on "Going-to-the-Sun Road" by Tim Bernardes; all music is composed by Robin Pecknold.

Shore track listing
No.	Title	Length
1.	"Wading in Waist-High Water"	2:15
2.	"Sunblind"	4:13
3.	"Can I Believe You"	4:04
4.	"Jara"	4:09
5.	"Featherweight"	3:50
6.	"A Long Way Past the Past"	3:59
7.	"For a Week or Two"	2:11
8.	"Maestranza"	3:03
9.	"Young Man's Game"	3:11
10.	"I'm Not My Season"	3:11
11.	"Quiet Air / Gioia"	4:27
12.	"Going-to-the-Sun Road"	3:58
13.	"Thymia"	2:22
14.	"Cradling Mother, Cradling Woman"	5:10
15.	"Shore"	4:19
Total length:		54:22

Notes

- "Cradling Mother, Cradling Woman" contains a sample of an a cappella version of "Don't Talk (Put Your Head on My Shoulder)" from The Pet Sounds Sessions.

== Credits ==
Credits adapted from the album's liner notes.

Musicians

- Robin Pecknold – vocals, instrumental performance, arrangements
- Uwade Akhere – vocals (1, 3, 15)
- The Westerlies
  - Riley Mulherkar – trumpet (1, 2, 6, 12, 13, 14, 15)
  - Chloe Rowlands – trumpet (1, 2, 6, 12, 13, 14, 15)
  - Andy Clausen – trombone (1, 2, 6, 12, 13, 14, 15)
  - Willem de Koch – trombone (1, 2, 6, 12, 13, 14, 15)
- Joshua Jaeger – drum kit and percussion (2, 6, 11, 15)
- Marta Sofia Honer – violin and viola (14)
- Michael Bloch – classical guitar (5)
- Christopher Bear – drum kit and percussion (1, 2, 3, 4, 5, 11, 12, 14, 15)
- Daniel Rossen – electric guitar, acoustic guitar, and piano (14)
- Homer Steinweiss – drum kit (2, 4, 8, 9)
- Kevin Morby – backing vocals (2) (Note: The liner notes erroneously credit Kevin Morby on "Wading in Waist-High Water"; Morby appears on "Sunblind".)
- Meara O'Reilly – vocals and vocal arrangements (4, 6, 14, 15)
- Tim Bernardes – vocals (12)
- Georgiana Leithauser – backing vocals (1, 9)
- Frederika Leithauser – backing vocals (1, 9)
- Juliet Butters – backing vocals (1, 9)
- Faye Butters – backing vocals (1, 9)
- Beatriz Artola – spoken dialog (14)

Technical

- Robin Pecknold – production
- Beatriz Artola – engineering, recording, mixing
- Jon Low – additional engineering
- Bastien Lozier – additional engineering
- Michael Harris – additional engineering
- Chris Cerullo – additional engineering
- Paul Spring – additional engineering
- Jens Jungkurth – additional engineering
- Lauren Marquez – additional engineering
- Joe LaPorta – mastering (Sterling Sound)

Design

- Ben Tousley – layout, design
- Robin Pecknold – layout, design
- Hiroshi Hamaya – front/back cover photographs
- Kersti Jan Werdal – gatefold photograph
- Dino Matt – drawings

Studios

- The Long Pond, Columbia County, New York (September 2019)
- Studios St Germain, Paris, France (October 2019)
- Vox Recording, Los Angeles, California (November 2019–March 2020)
- The Diamond Mine, Long Island City, Queens (July 2020–August 2020)
- Electric Lady Studios, Greenwich Village, New York (August 2020)

== Charts ==
Chart performance for Shore
Chart (2020–2021)	Peak position
Australian Albums (ARIA)	13
Austrian Albums (Ö3 Austria)	50
Belgian Albums (Ultratop Flanders)	3
Belgian Albums (Ultratop Wallonia)	36
Dutch Albums (Album Top 100)	16
German Albums (Offizielle Top 100)	5
Irish Albums (Official Charts)	16
Scottish Albums (Official Charts)	3
Swedish Albums (Sverigetopplistan)	54
Swiss Albums (Schweizer Hitparade)	13
UK Albums (Official Charts)	5
US Billboard 200	28
US Top Rock Albums (Billboard)	3
