= Poor Moon =

Poor Moon may refer to:

- Poor Moon (band), an American band
- Poor Moon (Poor Moon album), 2012
- Poor Moon (Hiss Golden Messenger album), 2012
- "Poor Moon", song by Canned Heat
