= A Very Lonely Solstice =

Live album by Fleet Foxes
- Released: December 10, 2021
- Venue: St. Ann & the Holy Trinity Church
- Length: 45:02
- Label: Anti-

Fleet Foxes chronology
Shore (2020)	A Very Lonely Solstice (2021)

Singles from A Very Lonely Solstice
- 1. "Can I Believe You" / "Wading in Waist-High Water" Released: July 17, 2021

A Very Lonely Solstice is the first live album by American band Fleet Foxes, released on December 10, 2021, by Anti- Records. It was first livestreamed as a pre-recorded concert film on December 21, 2020.

== Background and release ==
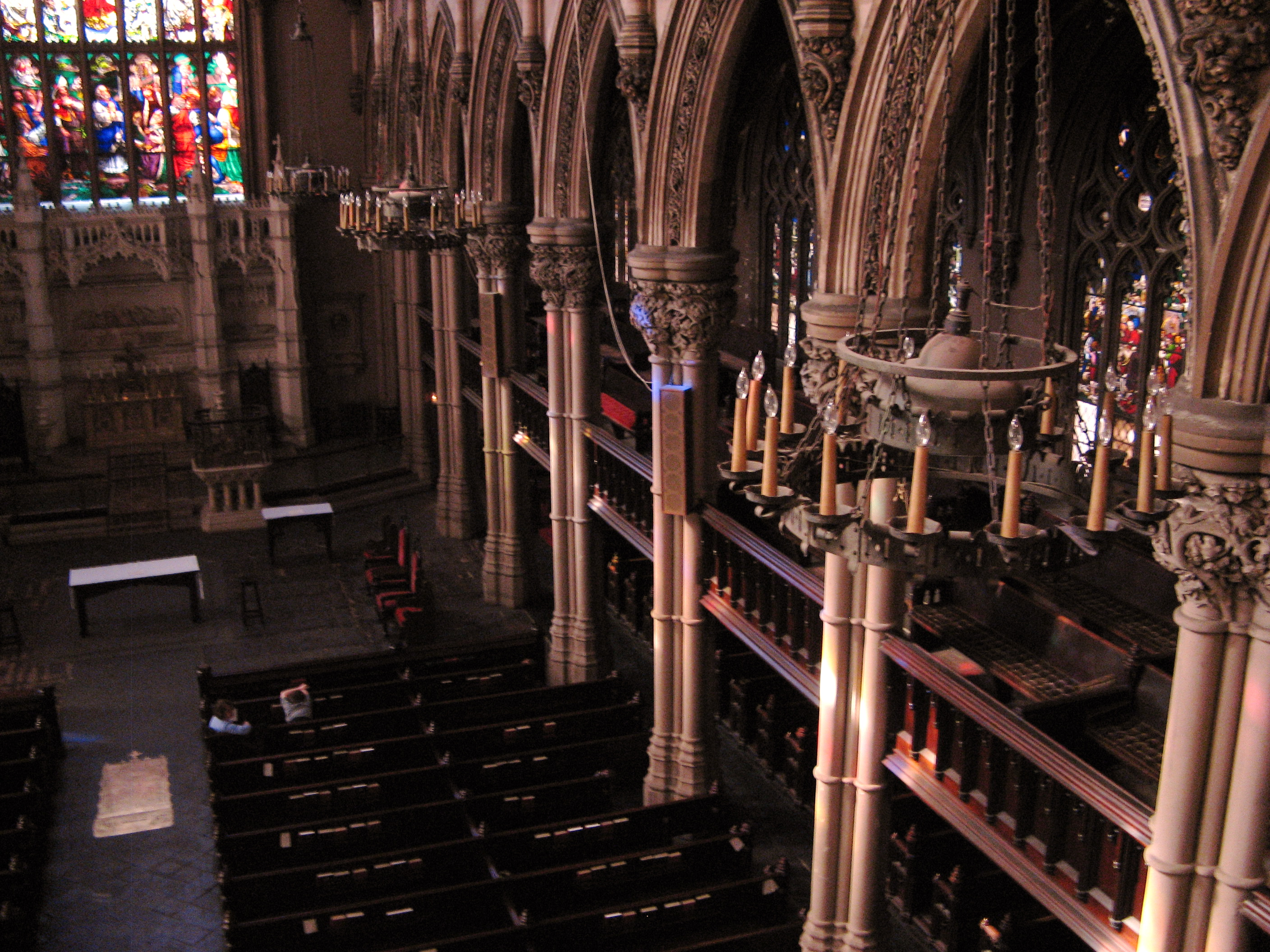
Interior of St. Ann and the Holy Trinity Church in Brooklyn, New York City.

On September 22, 2020, Fleet Foxes released their fourth studio album Shore. It was announced one day in advance of its release, and was intentionally released exactly at the autumnal equinox. It was the follow-up to their 2017 album Crack-Up and the band's first release on Anti- Records. It was also their second album since regrouping in 2016 after a three-year hiatus.

A virtual, pre-recorded concert performance entitled A Very Lonely Solstice was livestreamed at 9 pm ET on December 21, 2020, coinciding with the winter solstice. The concert features lead singer Robin Pecknold performing an acoustic solo set inside the St. Ann & the Holy Trinity Church in Brooklyn. It begins with a performance of "Wading in Waist-High Water" featuring the Resistance Revival Chorus, a collective of women and nonbinary singers. The rest of the performance features Pecknold performing solo on acoustic guitar. It includes performances of songs from Shore and older Fleet Foxes songs, as well as cover versions of the traditional folk ballad "Silver Dagger" and the Bee Gees song "In the Morning". A Very Lonely Solstice is dedicated to Sam Jayne of the band Love as Laughter.

"Can I Believe You" / "Wading in Waist-High Water" was released as an exclusive 7" vinyl single on July 17, 2021, as part of Record Store Day.

On December 6, 2021, Fleet Foxes announced the release of a new live album entitled A Very Lonely Solstice. The album was released digitally on December 10, 2021, by Anti- Records. The concert film was also made available to stream on YouTube the same day, whereas vinyl and CD were released on July 1, 2022, through Anti-.

== Critical reception ==
Professional ratings
Review scores
Source	Rating
American Songwriter	3.5/5 stars
Uncut	8/10

Kitty Empire of The Observer wrote, "Even without his band's trademark harmonies, Fleet Foxes frontman Robin Pecknold lights up this bleakest of winters." Empire, however, lamented the underuse of the Resistance Revival Chorus. Peter Watts of Uncut gave the album an 8 out of 10 rating, writing, "Pecknold is able to deliver a captivating performance that is sombre but never dull, with the mid-set trio of "Helplessness Blues", "Silver Dagger" and "Featherweight" particularly magnificent. American Songwriter's Lee Zimmerman wrote, "The fact that the performance was recorded during the winter solstice adds an atmospheric presence that underscores the melancholy mood of Pecknold's lonely laments."

== Track listing ==
All tracks are written by Robin Pecknold, except where noted.

A Very Lonely Solstice track listing
No.	Title	Length
1.	"Wading in Waist-High Water" (featuring the Resistance Revival Chorus)	2:10
2.	"Sunblind"	4:24
3.	"In the Morning" (Barry Gibb)	2:12
4.	"Tiger Mountain Peasant Song"	3:53
5.	"Maestranza"	2:55
6.	"Helplessness Blues"	5:03
7.	"Silver Dagger" (Traditional)	3:42
8.	"Featherweight"	3:47
9.	"A Long Way Past the Past"	3:44
10.	"Blue Spotted Tail"	3:08
11.	"If You Need to, Keep Time on Me"	2:55
12.	"I'm Not My Season"	3:10
13.	"Can I Believe You" (featuring the Resistance Revival Chorus)	3:59
Total length:		45:02

== Charts ==
Chart performance for A Very Lonely Solstice
Chart (2022)	Peak position
Belgian Albums (Ultratop Flanders)	104
Scottish Albums (Official Charts)	35
Swiss Albums (Schweizer Hitparade)	57
UK Independent Albums (Official Charts)	8
