= Silver Dagger (song) =

Traditional song performed by Joan Baez

Song by Joan Baez

from the album Joan Baez
- Language: English
- Released: 1960
- Genre: Folk
- Label: Vanguard
- Composer: Traditional

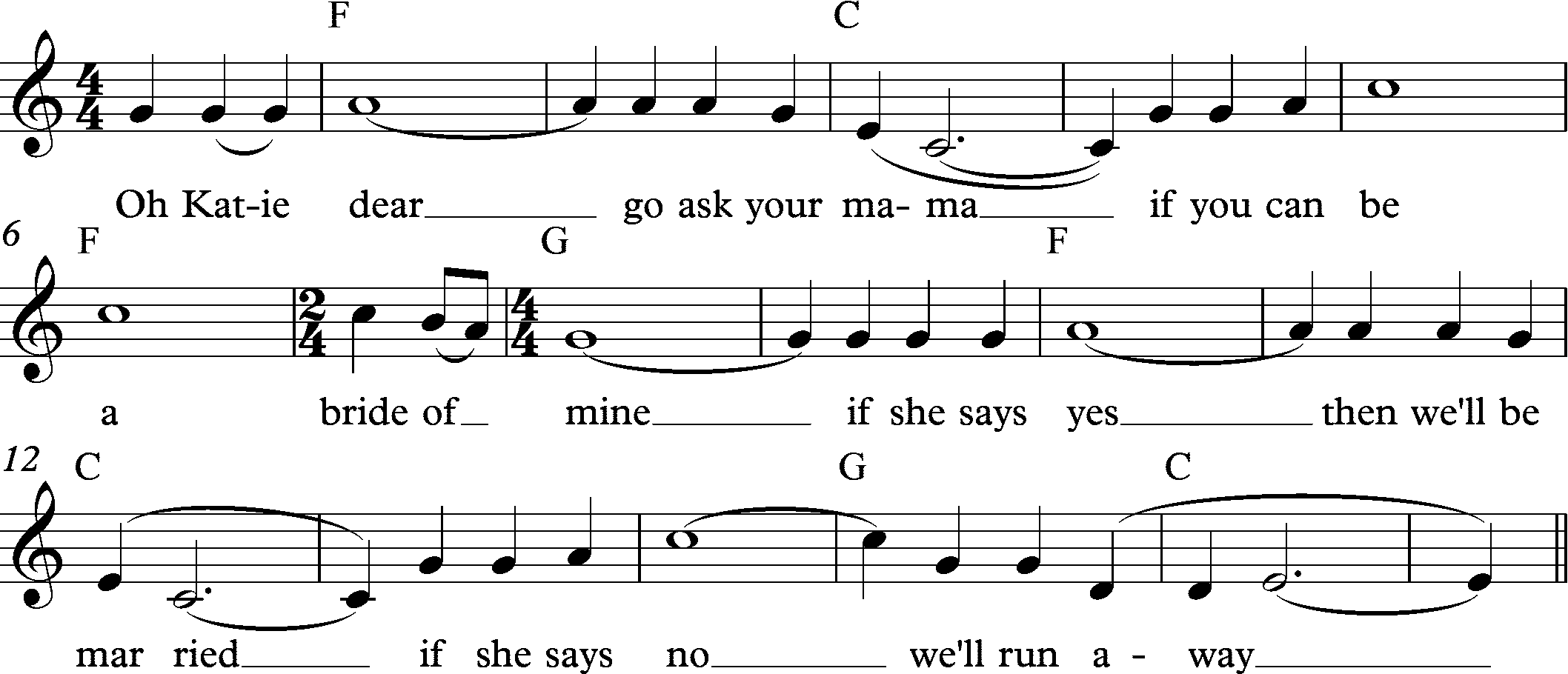
Silver Dagger Midi file of the score above, one of a number of different melodies used for the song.

"Silver Dagger", with variants such as "Katy Dear", "Molly Dear", "The Green Fields and Meadows", "Awake, Awake, Ye Drowsy Sleepers" and others (Laws M4 & G21, Roud 711, 2260 & 2261), is an American folk ballad, whose origins lie possibly in Britain. These songs of different titles are closely related, and two strands in particular became popular in commercial country music and folk music recordings of the twentieth century: the "Silver Dagger" version popularised by Joan Baez, and the "Katy Dear" versions popularised by close harmony brother duets such as The Callahan Brothers, The Blue Sky Boys and The Louvin Brothers.

In "Silver Dagger", the female narrator turns away a potential suitor, as her mother has warned her to avoid the advances of men in an attempt to spare her daughter the heartbreak that she herself has endured. The 1960 recording by Joan Baez features only a fragment of the full ballad. "Katy Dear" uses the same melody but different lyrics, telling a similar story from a male perspective.

== History ==
=== Origin ===
The song exists in a large number of variations under many different titles, with lyrics that may show a mixture of different songs. Steve Roud observes on one version of the song titled "O! Molly Dear Go Ask Your Mother":

"A whole book could be written on this song and its connections with other songs which involve young men at their sweethearts' windows at night, disapproving parents and silver daggers. Hugely popular with North American traditional singers, 'Drowsy Sleeper' was also collected regularly in Britain and appeared on broadsides there from at least the 1820s"

Of interest are early versions of two songs, "Silver Dagger" and "Drowsy Sleeper", that are related thematically and may share a common origin in the older theme of night visit in traditional English songs, but they differ in lines, verse rhythm and outcome in their lyrics. The plot of "Silver Dagger" is similar to that of "Drowsy Sleeper" whereby the parents object to a match between a boy and a girl, except that in "Silver Dagger" the dagger is used as a suicide weapon by the young lovers, while in "Drowsy Sleeper" the couple elope. However, at some point in the 19th century, there also appears to have been a fusion of these two different songs whereby the tragic ending of "Silver Dagger" becomes attached to "Drowsy Sleeper", giving rise to some later variations of the song.

The earliest known text of "Drowsy Sleeper" in Britain may be dated to 1817, and the first verse of a variant of the song appears in a songbook of American folk songs first published in 1855, John G. McCurry's The Social Harp. Early publications of "Silver Dagger" in the US may be found in Spirit of the Times and Gazette of the Union, Golden Rule and Odd-fellows' Family Companion in 1849. A version of "Drowsy Sleeper" published in a broadside as "Who's at My Bedroom Window?" by H. J. Wehman in 1890 shows a mixture of "Silver Dagger" and "Drowsy Sleeper". A version collected in Kentucky was printed in The Journal of American Folk-Lore in 1907, and three versions were collected by Henry M. Belden in 1908. Cecil Sharp published an English version from Somerset in 1908 as "Arise! Arise!". Sharp also collected a version of the song in the United States as "Awake, awake", sung by Mary Sands in Madison County, North Carolina on August 1, 1916.

The differences in titles and lyrics may also be due to the song being handed down through unwritten oral traditions, or adaptation from different sources, where each performer may add their own verses and nuances to the song. These songs may be sung using different tunes. Relation to other songs such as "Old Virginny"/"Man of Constant Sorrow" and "Come All You Fair and Tender Ladies" have also been noted.

=== Early recordings ===
The only traditional recording of the song according to the Vaughan Williams Memorial Library was a 1939 Herbert Halpert recording of James Taylor Adams and Finley Adams in Dunham, Kentucky, where the song was called "Poor Goins".

The song was recorded commercially as "O! Molly Dear Go Ask Your Mother" by Kelly Harrell in 1926, as "Sleepy Desert" by Wilmer Watts And The Lonely Eagles in 1929, and as "Wake Up You Drowsy Sleeper" by The Oaks family in 1930. As "Katie Dear (Silver Dagger)" it was recorded by the Callahan Brothers in 1934, and as "Katie Dear" by the Blue Sky Boys in 1938. (Country music authority Bill C. Malone states that the Callahan Brothers learned traditional ballads like "Katie Dear" from their mother). In 1956 it was recorded by the Louvin Brothers. The song was part of the repertoire of the Country Gentlemen, who toured both the bluegrass and folk music circuits during the 1950s and 1960s. In the early 1960s, "Katie Dear" was recorded by folk revival musicians, including Joan Baez, and Ian & Sylvia. Today it is commonly performed and recorded by bluegrass musicians.

== Lyrics ==
"Silver Dagger" as sung by Joan Baez

Don't sing love songs; you'll wake my mother
She's sleeping here, right by my side
And in her right hand, a silver dagger
She says that I can't be your bride.

All men are false, says my mother
They'll tell you wicked, lovin' lies
The very next evening, they'll court another
Leave you alone to pine and sigh.

My daddy is a handsome devil
He's got a chain five miles long
And on every link a heart does dangle
Of another maid he's loved and wronged.

Go court another tender maiden
And hope that she will be your wife
For I've been warned and I've decided
To sleep alone all of my life.

"Katy Dear" as sung by Ian & Sylvia

Oh, Katy Dear, go ask your father
If you might be a bride of mine
If he says yes then come and tell me
If he says no, we'll run away.

I cannot go and ask my father
For he is on his bed of rest
And by his side there's a golden dagger
To pierce the heart I love the best.

Oh Katy Dear, go ask your mother
If you might be a bride of mine
If she says yes then come and tell me
If she says no, we'll run away.

I cannot go and ask my mother
For she is on her bed of rest
And by her side there's a silver dagger
To pierce the heart I love the best.

He picked up a silver dagger
He pierced it through his wounded breast
Farewell Katy, farewell darling
I'll die for the one I love the best.

She picked up the bloody weapon
She pierced it through her snow-white breast
Farewell Momma Farewell Poppa
I'll go with the one I love the best.

"Wake Up You Drowsy Sleeper" as sung by the Oaks Family

Wake up, wake up, you drowsy sleeper,
Wake up, wake up, for it's almost day
Stick your head out at the window
And see your true love march away

Who is it that has come so early?
Who is it that has come so soon?
Catie dear, it your true lover
That came so early and so soon

Catie dear go ask your parents
If you may be the[/my] bride of mine
If they say no return and tell me
And no longer will I pine

Willy dear, it's no use [to] ask them
They're in their room a takin' a rest
And in their hands they both hold daggers
To kill the one that I love best

I then take out my silver dagger
And pierce it in my tender breast
Saying goodbye Catie, goodbye darling
I'll die for the one that I love best

I'll then take up his bloody dagger
And pierce it in my lily white breast
Saying goodbye Catie, goodbye darling
I'll die for the one that I love best

Oh may this day be long remembered
Oh, may this day be ne'er forgot
To all you cruel ill hearted parents
Who try to keep true lovers apart

== Recordings and performances ==
The song has also been widely performed and recorded by bluegrass musicians, as many songs thought of as traditionally bluegrass songs actually trace back to what is now known as "old-time" music.

=== 20th century ===
- 1926 – Kelly Harrell – "O! Molly Dear Go Ask Your Mother", Victor Vi 20280 (BVE-35667). Reissued on Worried Blues, The Complete Commercial Output of Frank Hutchison and Kerry Harrell JSP Records JSP7743 (2005), My Bonnie Lies Over The Ocean: British Songs in the US Nehi Records NEH3X1 (2015).
- 1927 – B. F. Shelton – "Oh Molly Dear" (BVE-39735).
- 1929 – Wilmer Watts & His Lonely Eagles – "Sleepy Desert", Paramount Pm 3282. Reissued on Gastonia Gallop, Cotton Mill Songs & Hillbilly Blues Old Hat Records CD-1007 (2009), My Bonnie Lies Over The Ocean: British Songs in the USA Nehi Records NEH3X1 (2015).
- 1930 – The Oaks Family – "Wake up, You Drowsy Sleeper", Victor Vi 23795 (BVE-62575). Reissued on My Bonnie Lies Over The Ocean: British Songs in the USA Nehi Records NEH3X1 (2015).
- 1934 – Callahan Brothers – "'Katie Dear (Silver Dagger)", Banner Ba 33103. Melotone Me 13071, Oriole Or 8353, Perfect 13017, Romeo Ro 5353. Reissued on The Dixon Brothers with The Callahan Brothers JSP Records JSP77113 (2011).
- 1938 – Blue Sky Boys – "Katie Dear", Bluebird BB B-7661, Montgomery Ward Records MW M-7468. Reissued on The Blue Sky Boys, The Very Best of Classic Country Remastered JSP Records JSP7782 (2007).
- 1938 – The Carter Family – "Who's The Knockin' On My Window", Decca De 5612, Montgomery Ward MW M-8071, Melotone (Canada) MeC 45275. Reissued on The Carter Family, Volume 2, 1935-1941 JSP Records JSP7708 (2003).
- 1956 – The Louvin Brothers, Tragic Songs of Life.
- 1960 – Joan Baez's version of "Silver Dagger" was included in her 1960 debut album, and song became identified with her. On her performances, Baez used a double-time acoustic guitar as accompaniment to her vocals.
- 1963 – The Country Gentlemen, on Hootenanny: A Bluegrass Special and on Bluegrass Country.
- 1964 – Ian & Sylvia, Four Strong Winds.
- 1964 – Bob Dylan – "Silver Dagger" appears on The Bootleg Series Vol. 6: Bob Dylan Live 1964, Concert at Philharmonic Hall album, with Baez singing what she refers jokingly to as "one of Bob's earlier songs". Dylan does not sing, but plays acoustic guitar and harmonica in accompaniment.
- 1964 – Dave Van Ronk performs a comical version of the song in his album Inside Dave Van Ronk.
- 1967- Barbara Dane recorded the song as "Don't Sing Love Songs" on her album Anthology of American Folk Songs
- 1960s – Chet Powers – The song appears, in the long version, on his album released in 2011 under the name of Dino Valente, Get Together...The Lost Recordings.
- 1970s – The Eagles – During their concerts in the early 1970s, the Eagles usually prefaced "Take it Easy" with an a cappella version of four lines from "Silver Dagger", beginning with "My Daddy is a handsome devil..." Glenn Frey, Bernie Leadon and Randy Meisner would harmonise around one microphone at the front of the stage with Don Henley also contributing from behind his drum kit.
- 1987 – The Men They Couldn't Hang recorded a version of the song which is included as a bonus track on some releases of their 1987 album Waiting for Bonaparte.
- 1999 – Dolly Parton recorded the song in 1999 for her The Grass Is Blue album.

=== 21st century ===
- Old time revival string band Old Crow Medicine Show has a version of the song on their 2001 album Eutaw.
- Roger Mcguinn, the lead singer and guitarist on many of The Byrds' hits, released a version of the song on the four-CD box set The Folk Den Project 1995-2005.
- British folk punk band The Men They Couldn't Hang recorded "Silver Dagger" for their 2005 live album Smugglers and Bounty Hunters.
- English harmony singing group The Devil's Interval recorded "Silver Dagger" for their 2006 album Blood and Honey.
- Irish-American Celtic group Solas recorded it for their 2006 album Reunion: A Decade of Solas.
- The Seldom Scene recorded this song on their 2007 album Scenechronized.
- English folk singer-songwriter Martha Tilston recorded it on her 2007 album Of Milkmaids and Architects
- The song has been recorded by White Antelope aka Robin Pecknold of the Seattle band Fleet Foxes.
- American folk singer Lissa Schneckenburger recorded the "Awake Awake, Ye Drowsy Sleepers" variant (as "The Drowsy Sleeper") on her 2008 album Song.
- This song has also been recorded by Lac La Belle, on their first album, called Lac La Belle, in 2009 (Detroit, USA).
- Jim Moray has recorded a version of this song which is available on his 2010 album In Modern History.
- The song is sung by Marideth Sisco in the 2010 film Winter's Bone.
- English folk trio The Staves often perform the song live. It has been included in their Live at Cecil Sharp House EP (2011).
- In season 5, episode 2 ("Gently with Class") of the British television series Inspector George Gently, the song is performed by Ebony Buckle, who plays the role of singer "Ellen Mallam" in that episode.
- Seasick Steve recorded a version for his 2015 album Sonic Soul Surfer.
- The High Bar Gang included the Dolly Parton arrangement (she is credited as its author) on their 2016 album Someday the Heart will Trouble the Mind.
- The song was included in the 2016 CD "Side Orders" by Circe Link and Christian Nesmith.
- Fleet Foxes featured the song on their 2018 compilation album First Collection 2006–2009. They also included another version of the song on their 2021 live album A Very Lonely Solstice.
- Monica Barbaro sings the song in her role as Joan Baez in the 2024 film A Complete Unknown.
- Paul Mescal and Josh O'Connor each sing a rendition in the 2025 film The History of Sound.

=== Adaptations ===
- Dame Darcy recorded a quite different version of the song, found on her Greatest Hits album.
- British band Saint Etienne's song "Like a Motorway" is based on the ballad. It was featured on their album Tiger Bay (1994), an homage to folk music presented in a modern style. The melody follows the original closely, but new lyrics paint a darker picture of the suitor's fate.
- Hey Rosetta gave us their own take on this song, which found on their Red Songs EP. The song however, is entitled, "Who Is At My Window Weeping" rather than "Silver Dagger".
- William Gibson in the second book of his Sprawl Trilogy, Count Zero, the character Angie Mitchell sings the lyrics starting with "my daddy is a handsome devil" to hint at the past of her father and her relationship with him.
- English folk singer/songwriter Chris Wood adapted the "Awake Awake, Ye Drowsy Sleepers" variant for his song "Hollow Point," about the killing of Jean Charles de Menezes by British police in 2005.

== See also ==
- Come All You Fair and Tender Ladies, another ballad with similar content
