= Illusion (Poor Moon EP) =

EP by Poor Moon
- Released: March 27, 2012
- Length: 16:17
- Label: Sub Pop

Poor Moon chronology
Illusion (2012)	Poor Moon (album) (2012)

Illusion is the first release of the Washington-based band Poor Moon. It was released by Sub Pop on March 27, 2012.

== Track listing ==
No.	Title	Length
1.	"Illusion"	3:31
2.	"Anyplace"	2:58
3.	"People in Her Mind"	3:05
4.	"Once Before"	3:35
5.	"Widow"	3:08
