= Hiroshi Hamaya =

Japanese photographer (1915–1999)

- Hamaya photographed by Ian Berry in a Scottish cafe in 1973
- Born: Hiroshi Hamaya (濱谷 浩); March 28, 1915; Shitaya, Ueno, Tokyo, Japan
- Died: March 6, 1999 (aged 83) or March 15, 1999 (aged 83); Japan
- Known for: Photography

Hiroshi Hamaya (濱谷 浩 (Note: In modern script, this is 浜谷浩: Hamaya and his publishers seem to have used the older character for hama (濱) rather consistently even after the nationwide orthographic reform, but his name is sometimes found written with the simplified character.), Hamaya Hiroshi; 28 March 1915 – 6 or 15 March 1999) was a Japanese photographer active from 1935 to 1999. In particular, Hamaya was known for his photographs of rural Japan.

== Biography ==
Hamaya was born in Shitaya, Tokyo, Japan, on 28 March 1915.

After becoming independent as a freelance cameraman in 1937, he co-founded the Avant-Garde Photography Association the following year with Shūzō Takiguchi, Hamaya's brother Masao Tanaka, and others. In the same year, with the support of Photo Times, he also helped establish the Youth Reportage Photography Research Association with Ken Domon and others.

Between 1942 and 1945 he contributed to Front, the propaganda photo journal of the Tōhō-sha company.

Hamaya died on 6 March 1999.

== Recognition ==
By 1955 one of Hiroshi Hamaya's photographs, a high-angle view of kimono-clad springtime dancers led by his wife, was included by curator Edward Steichen in the world-touring Museum of Modern Art exhibition The Family of Man that was seen by more than 9 million visitors.

In 1956, Hamaya published his acclaimed photobook "Snow Country" (Yukiguni) featuring photographs of Japan's frigid northeastern Tōhoku region in winter.

In 1960, Hamaya took part in the massive Anpo protests against revision of the U.S.-Japan Security Treaty, and published a book of his photographs of the protesters titled "A Record of Anger and Sadness" (Ikari to kanashimi no kiroku), reflecting Hamaya's disappointment that the protests failed to stop the treaty.

Hamaya was the first Japanese photographer to join Magnum Photos in 1960, as an associate member. He received the Master of Photography Award from the International Center of Photography (New York) in 1986.

Hamaya's photograph 'Eroded Sea Cliff at Tōjinbō, Early Winter, Fukui Prefecture, Japan, 1960' was used as the front cover artwork for Fleet Foxes' 2017 studio album Crack-Up. The band's 2020 album Shore featured Hamaya's 'Outlet, Bering Glacier, Alaska 1973' and 'Rivulet Flowing Among Trees, Akan, Hokkaidō, Japan 1964' as the front and back cover photos, respectively.

== Published collections of Hamaya's works ==
=== Publications dedicated to Hamaya's works ===
- Senkō shashinjutsu (閃光寫眞術 (Note: Old orthography (then current) for shashinjutsu; in modern form this would be 写真術.)). Ars Shashin Bunko (アルス寫眞文庫). Tokyo: Ars, 1941. A handbook on flash photography.
- Yukiguni: Hamaya Hiroshi shashinshū: Kamera Mainichi bessatsu (雪国 濱谷浩写真集 カメラ毎日別冊). Tokyo: Mainichi Shinbunsha, 1956. Photographs of Japan's "snow country", the northeast coast of Honshū. Published in conjunction with Camera Mainichi.
- Ura Nihon: Hamaya Hiroshi shashinshū (裏日本 濱谷浩写真集) / Japan's Back Coast. Tokyo: Shinchōsha, 1957. The title means "back-country Japan".
- Henkyō no machi (邊境の町 (Note: The photographer or publisher's deliberate use of old orthography for henkyō; in modern form this would be 辺境.)) / Urumchi. Sekai Shashinka Shirīzu (世界写真家シリーズ). Tokyo: Heibonsha, 1957. Photographs of Ürümqi.
- Mite kita Chūgoku (見てきた中国) / The China I Have Seen. Tokyo: Kawade Shobō Shinsha, 1958. A separate booklet contains an English translation.
- Shi no furusato (詩のふるさと). Tokyo: Chūōkōronsha, 1958.
- Hamaya Hiroshi shashinshū (浜谷浩作品集). Gendai Nihon shashin zenshū (現代日本写真全集). Tokyo: Sōgensha, 1958. Number 3 in a set of nine booklets of Japanese photography, the only other photographers having entire booklets devoted to their work being Ihei Kimura and Ken Domon.
- Kodomo fūdoki (こども風土記) / Children in Japan. Tokyo: Chūōkōronsha, 1959. Photographs of children in Japan.
- Ikari to kanashimi no kiroku (怒りと悲しみの記録). Tokyo: Kawade Shobō Shinsha, 1960.
- Nihon rettō (日本列島) / Landscapes of Japan. Tokyo: Heibonsha, 1964.
- Eye: Hiroshi Hamaya photographs. Ōiso, Kanagawa: Hamaya Hiroshi, 1968.
- American America. Tokyo: Kawade Shobō Shinsha, 1971.
- Hamaya Hiroshi-shū (濱谷浩集). Chikuma Foto Gyararī (筑摩フォト・ギャラリー). Tokyo: Chikuma Shobō, 1971.
- Senzō zanzō: Shashinka no taikenteki kaisō (潜像残像 写真家の体験的回想). Tokyo: Kawade Shobō Shinsha, 1971.
- Nihon no shika: Shashinshū (日本の詩歌 写真集). Tokyo: Chūōkōronsha, 1972.
- Aizu Yaichi (会津八一). Ōiso, Kanagawa: Hamaya Hiroshi, 1972. A portfolio about the poet and art historian Aizu Yaichi.
- Nihon no shizen (日本の自然) Landscape of Japan. 2 vols. Tokyo: Kokusai-jōhō-sha, 1975.
- Yukiguni (雪国). Sonorama Shashin Sensho (ソノラマ写真選書) 1. Tokyo: Asahi Sonorama, 1977.
- Kohō Fuji (孤峰富士). Nihon no bi (日本の美). Tokyo: Shūeisha, 1978. (Note: Here within CiNii.)
- Nankyoku hantō natsu-keshiki (南極半島夏景色) / Summer Shots: Antarctic Peninsula. Tokyo: Asahi Sonorama, 1979.
- Hamaya Hiroshi shashinshū-sei-ten: 1930–1981 (濱谷浩写真集成展 1930–1981). Tokyo: PPS Tsūshinsha, 1981.
- Chi no kao (地の貌). Hamaya Hiroshi shashinshū-sei (浜谷浩写真集成) 1. Tokyo: Iwanami shoten, 1981. Title means "Aspects of nature".
- Sei no kao (生の貌). Hamaya Hiroshi shashinshū-sei (浜谷浩写真集成) 2. Tokyo: Iwanami shoten, 1981.
- Landscapes. New York: Abrams 1982. ISBN 0-8109-1278-3. English-language version of Chi no kao (1981).
- Tabi: Shashinshū (旅 写真集). Tokyo: Nihon Kōtsū-kōsha, 1982.
- Hiroshi Hamaya. I Grandi Fotografi. [Milano]: Gruppo Editoriale Fabbri, [1982].
- Gakugei shoka (學藝諸家 (Note: The photographer or publisher's deliberate use of old orthography for gakugei; in modern form this would be 学芸.)) / Gakugei Shoka. Tokyo: Iwanami, 1983. 2nd ed. Tokyo: Iwanami, 1991. ISBN 4-00-000300-3. Black and white portraits of writers and other people in the arts, 1937–82. Texts in Japanese, captions in Japanese and English.
- Hiroshi Hamaya. Los Grandes Fotografos. Barcelona: Ediciones Orbis, 1984.
- Nyonin rekijitsu: Hamaya Asa tsuitō shashinchō (女人暦日 濱谷朝追悼写真帖) / Calendar days of Asaya Hamaya, 1948–1950. Ōiso, Kanagawa: Hamaya Hiroshi, 1985. A portfolio of photographs of Hamaya's wife taken 1948–1950, issued as a memorial to her after her death.
- Shōwa nyoninshū: Shashinshū (昭和女人集 写真集) / Women in the Showa Era. Tokyo: Mainichi Shinbun-sha, 1985.
- Hamaya Hiroshi ten: ICP masutā-obu-fotogurafī-shō jushō kinen (濱谷浩展 ICPマスター・オブ・フォトグラフィー賞受賞記念) / Hiroshi Hamaya: Fifty-Five Years of Photography. Tokyo: PPS Tsūshinsha, 1986.
- Emergence de la terre. Neuilly: Éditions Hologramme, 1986. With a preface by Marc Riboud.
- Shōwa dansei shokun: Shashinshū (昭和男性諸君 写真集). Tokyo: Asahi Shinbun-sha, 1989. ISBN 4-02-258378-9.
- Hamaya Hiroshi: Shashin taiken 60 nen (濱谷浩 写真体験60年). Hiratsuka, Kanagawa: Hiratsuka Museum of Art, 1991. Catalogue of an exhibition held at the Hiratsuka Museum of Art.
- Senzō zanzō: Shashin taiken 60 nen (潜像残像 写真体験60年). Tokyo: Chikuma Shobō, 1991. ISBN 4-480-01348-2.
- Shashinshū watakushi (写真集私). Ōiso, Kanagawa: Shōnan Bunko, 1991.
- Shashin no seiki: Hamaya Hiroshi shashin taiken roku-jū-roku-nen (写真の世紀 濱谷浩写真体験六六年). Tokyo: Tokyo Metropolitan Museum of Photography, 1997. Catalogue of an exhibition of 66 years' work by Hamaya held at the Tokyo Metropolitan Museum of Photography.
- Fukuen zuisho no hitobito (福縁隨處の人びと (Note: The photographer or publisher's deliberate use of old orthography for zuisho; in modern form this would be 随処)). Tokyo: Sōjunsha, 1998. ISBN 4-7943-0528-1. Black and white portraits of writers and other people in the arts. Texts and captions in Japanese.
- Ichi no oto: 1930-nendai Tōkyō: Hamaya Hiroshi sakuhinshū (市の音 一九三〇年代・東京 濱谷浩写真集). Tokyo: Kawade Shobō Shinsha, 2009. ISBN 978-4-309-27108-8. Photographs of Tokyo in the 1930s.
- Ichi no oto: Machi no sazanuki: 1930-nendai Tōkyō: Hamaya Hiroshi sakuhinten (市の音・街のさざめき 1930年代・東京 濱谷浩作品展). JCII Photo Salon Library 238. Tokyo: JCII, 2011. Booklet accompanying an exhibition of photographs of Tokyo in the 1930s.

=== Other publications with major contributions by Hamaya ===
- Det Gömda Japan. Stockholm, Bonnier, 1960. Text by Bo Setterlind.
- Cornell Capa, ed. The Concerned Photographer 2. New York: Grossman, 1972. ISBN 0-670-23556-3 (hardback), ISBN 0-670-23557-1 (paperback). Photographs by Hamaya, Cornell Capa, Marc Riboud, Roman Vishniac, Bruce Davidson, Gordon Parks, Ernst Haas, Donald McCullin, and W. Eugene Smith.
- Shiga Prefecture. Ōtsu, Shiga: Shiga Prefectural Government, 1984. Hamaya contributes the photographs; the text is by various writers.
- Die Präfektur Shiga. Ōtsu, Shiga: Regierung der Präfektur Shiga, 1984.
- Modan Tōkyō rapusodi (モダン東京狂詩曲展) / Rhapsody of Modern Tokyo. Tokyo: Tokyo Metropolitan Museum of Photography, 1993. Catalogue of an exhibition of prewar street photography by Hamaya, Kineo Kuwabara, Kōji Morooka, Kōroku Ōkubo, Masao Horino and Yoshio Watanabe held at the Tokyo Metropolitan Museum of Photography.
- Judith Keller and Amanda Maddox, eds. Japan's Modern Divide: The Photographs of Hiroshi Hamaya and Kansuke Yamamoto. Los Angeles: J. Paul Getty Museum, 2013. ISBN 978-1-60606-132-9. Catalogue of an exhibition of the work of Hamaya and Kansuke Yamamoto.
