= Poor Moon (band) =

American indie folk band

- Origin: Seattle, Washington, U.S.
- Genres: Indie folk; indie pop
- Years active: 2012–present
- Labels: Sub Pop; Bella Union
- Members: Christian Wargo; Casey Wescott; Ian Murray; Peter Murray

Poor Moon is an American indie folk band, formed in Seattle in 2012, composed of Christian Wargo, Casey Wescott, and Ian and Peter Murray. Poor Moon is a side project of Wargo and Wescott, who are members of Fleet Foxes, Poor Moon is signed to record label Bella Union (UK) and Sub Pop Records. The band is named after lead singer Wargo's favourite song by Canned Heat. The band's debut EP, Illusion, was released in March 2012.

== Releases ==
- Illusion EP (March 27, 2012)
- Poor Moon (August 28, 2012)
