= Crack-Up (album) =

Studio album by Fleet Foxes
- Released: June 16, 2017
- Recorded: July 2016–January 2017
- Studio: Electric Lady, New York City; Sear Sound, New York City; Rare Book Room, New York City; The Unknown, Anacortes, Washington; Avast!, Seattle; The Void, Amenia, New York
- Genre: Progressive folk; indie folk; folk rock; indie rock
- Length: 55:09
- Label: Nonesuch
- Producer: Robin Pecknold; Skyler Skjelset

Fleet Foxes chronology
| Helplessness Blues (2011) | Crack-Up (2017) | Shore (2020) |

Singles from Crack-Up
- 1. "Third of May / Ōdaigahara" Released: March 7, 2017; 2. "Fool's Errand" Released: May 12, 2017; 3. "If You Need To, Keep Time on Me" Released: June 7, 2017

Crack-Up is the third studio album by American band Fleet Foxes, released on June 16, 2017, by Nonesuch Records. Loosely inspired by F. Scott Fitzgerald's essay collection of the same name, it is the follow-up to their 2011 album Helplessness Blues, following the band's three-year hiatus from 2013 to 2016. It is also the band's first release on the Nonesuch label after departing Sub Pop.

== Recording ==
Crack-Up was recorded at various locations across the United States between July 2016 and January 2017: Electric Lady Studios, Sear Sound, The Void, Rare Book Room, Avast Recording Company, and The Unknown. Phil Ek mixed the album at Sear Sound, and Greg Calbi mastered it at Sterling Sound.

== Release and promotion ==
Fleet Foxes released the first song from the album on March 7, 2017: "Third of May / Ōdaigahara", a "nearly nine-minute epic powered by piano and electric twelve-string guitar, string quartet, and the group's trademark sparkling harmonies"; on the same day, Robin Pecknold appeared on Apple Music's Beats 1 radio station to discuss the new song, as well as the band's hiatus and their upcoming tour. The song was released via Fleet Foxes' new YouTube channel, coupled with a lyric video created by Sean Pecknold and Adi Goodrich. The following day, Pecknold annotated some of the lyrics of the song using Genius, and appeared on BBC Radio 6 Music. An edited version of "Third of May / Ōdaigahara", with a duration of 4:02, was released three days later.

On March 18, 2017, Pecknold used Reddit to confirm a fan's theory that the first track on the new album would begin exactly where the last track on their previous album, Helplessness Blues, ended. Thus, the last notes of "Grown Ocean" will connect to the first notes of "I Am All That I Need / Arroyo Seco / Thumbprint Scar".

An album trailer made by Sean Pecknold was released on YouTube on April 4, 2017, featuring in-studio footage as well as previews of many forthcoming songs.

A first look at the packaging proofs of the vinyl was provided by Robin Pecknold on April 20, showcasing the front cover, the inside and the back cover. Many of the featured images are the work of the Japanese photographer Hiroshi Hamaya. When asked about the release of a second single from the album, Pecknold commented that it would be released in a "couple weeks" and that a music video was being made in the meantime. He later announced that the "20 most frequent commenters" on his Instagram page were being rewarded with signed test pressings of the album as an expression of gratitude for their support.

A second track "Fool's Errand" was released on May 12, along with a music video directed by Sean Pecknold, with art direction by Adi Goodrich, and starring Jade-Lorna Sullivan.

The band performed four tracks from the album live on KEXP on May 17.

To support the album, Fleet Foxes began touring on May 15, 2017, with four "intimate" shows in the US, where they debuted new material from Crack-Up, followed by four shows at the Sydney Opera House Concert Hall, with the final Sydney show being streamed on Facebook Live. The band then continued their tour throughout 2017, with concerts in Europe, the United States and Canada.

The band announced on June 6, 2017, that Beats 1 would broadcast the exclusive, official premiere of "If You Need to, Keep Time on Me" the following day. The song was uploaded to their YouTube channel the same day.

The entire album was released via NPR on June 8, 2017, ahead of its official release.

Prior to the album's release, Fleet Foxes performed "Third of May / Ōdaigahara" for Live from the Artists Den at The Knockdown Center in Queens, New York, later releasing the performance on their YouTube page.

The band appeared on The Late Show with Stephen Colbert on June 16, the day of the album's release, to perform "Third of May". The following morning, June 17, they appeared on CBS This Morning's Saturday Sessions, playing "Third of May", "If You Need To, Keep Time on Me", and "Fool's Errand" live from Electric Lady Studios in New York.

Robin Pecknold appeared on the June 22 episode of Hrishikesh Hirway's podcast Song Exploder to break down the song "Mearcstapa", mentioning Ali Farka Touré, Can and Steve Strohmeier as influences. The band then appeared on the July 14 episode of Talia Schlanger's World Cafe to discuss the album and play some tracks live.

Fleet Foxes returned to The Late Show with Stephen Colbert on October 26 to perform "Fool's Errand".

== Critical reception ==
Professional ratings
Aggregate scores
| Source | Rating |
|---|---|
| AnyDecentMusic? | 7.7/10 |
| Metacritic | 81/100 |
Review scores
| Source | Rating |
| AllMusic | 4/5 stars |
| The A.V. Club | C+ |
| Entertainment Weekly | B+ |
| The Guardian | 3/5 stars |
| The Independent | 4/5 stars |
| NME | 4/5 stars |
| The Observer | 4/5 stars |
| Pitchfork | 8.7/10 |
| Rolling Stone | 3.5/5 stars |
| The Times | 5/5 stars |

Crack-Up received widespread acclaim from contemporary music critics. At Metacritic, which assigns a normalized rating out of 100 to reviews from mainstream critics, the album received an average score of 81, based on 31 reviews, which indicates "universal acclaim".

In his review for AllMusic, Timothy Monger wrote that the album was, "Orchestral, experimental, and more challenging than either of the band's previous releases, it's a natural fit for the Nonesuch label, whose heritage was built on such attributes. For Fleet Foxes, it represents a shift away from their more idyllic early days into a period of artistic growth and sophistication." Ian Cohen for Pitchfork gave similar praise by stating that, "Crack-Up supports the heft of Pecknold's concerns by working on a massive scale that no band is really attempting in 2017, let alone able to accomplish. Fleet Foxes are still a folk act, though one that's absorbed far-flung versions of the term."

=== Accolades ===
| Publication | Accolade | Rank | Ref. |
|---|---|---|---|
| Exclaim | Top 20 Pop & Rock Albums of 2017 | 13 | |
| Pitchfork | The 50 Best Albums of 2017 | 39 | |
| AllMusic | Best of 2017 | —N/a | |
| Spin | 50 Best Albums of 2017 | 46 | |
| Under the Radar | Top 100 Albums of 2017 | 17 | |
| Double J | The 50 Best Albums of 2017 | 25 | |
| The Skinny | Top 50 Albums of 2017 | 45 | |
| PopMatters | The 60 Best Albums of 2017 | 16 | |
| MusicOMH | musicOMH's Top 50 Albums of 2017 | 19 | |
| Sputnikmusic | Top 50 Albums of 2017 | 22 | |

== Commercial performance ==
Crack-Up debuted at number nine on the US Billboard 200 with 34,000 album-equivalent units, of which 32,000 were pure album sales.

== Track listing ==
All tracks are written by Robin Pecknold, except string quartet on "I Am All That I Need / Arroyo Seco / Thumbprint Scar" and "I Should See Memphis", written by Gabriel Gall.

Crack-Up
| No. | Title | Length |
|---|---|---|
| 1. | "I Am All That I Need / Arroyo Seco / Thumbprint Scar" | 6:25 |
| 2. | "Cassius, –" | 4:50 |
| 3. | "– Naiads, Cassadies" | 3:10 |
| 4. | "Kept Woman" | 3:55 |
| 5. | "Third of May / Ōdaigahara" | 8:49 |
| 6. | "If You Need to, Keep Time on Me" | 3:30 |
| 7. | "Mearcstapa" | 4:10 |
| 8. | "On Another Ocean (January / June)" | 4:24 |
| 9. | "Fool's Errand" | 4:48 |
| 10. | "I Should See Memphis" | 4:44 |
| 11. | "Crack-Up" | 6:24 |
| Total length: | | 55:09 |

Sample credits

- "I Am All That I Need / Arroyo Seco / Thumbprint Scar" contains a recording of Fleet Foxes' "White Winter Hymnal" performed by Achievement First University Prep High School chorus "Phoenix Forte" under the direction of M. Anita Purcell.
- "On Another Ocean (January / June)" contains elements from "Tezeta" (traditional) performed by Mulatu Astatke.

== Personnel ==
Credits adapted from liner notes.

Fleet Foxes

- Robin Pecknold – vocals (tracks 1–11), classical guitar (tracks 1–6, 8–11), dreadnought (tracks 1, 2, 4–11), electric guitar (tracks 2–5, 7, 8, 11), 12 string acoustic (tracks 1, 2, 9, 11), 12 string electric (tracks 1–3, 7, 8), Fender bass (tracks 1–9, 11), piano (tracks 1–6, 8, 9, 11), synthesizer (tracks 7, 8), Baldwin electric harpsichord (tracks 2, 4, 5, 8, 9, 11), prepared autoharp (tracks 2, 5, 9), marimba (tracks 2, 4, 9), Moog Minitaur (tracks 1, 2, 5, 7, 9, 10), Hammond organ (tracks 2, 5, 6), mellotron (tracks 1, 8), train loop (track 1), water loop (track 2), Korg drum machine (tracks 1, 2), percussion (tracks 2, 3, 5, 10), varispeed (track 3), footsteps (tracks 8, 11), door (tracks 1, 8, 11), Memory Man Deluxe (track 10)
- Skyler Skjelset – vocals (tracks 5, 9), electric guitar (tracks 1, 2, 5), Fender bass (track 2), piano (tracks 4, 6), synthesizer (tracks 2, 4, 5, 8, 9), pencil on paper (track 2), cicada loop (track 2), glass harmonica (track 2), bowed cymbal (tracks 4, 11), shamisen (tracks 4, 5), percussion (track 5), programming (tracks 2, 4–6), Foley (tracks 2, 6), Korg drum machine (track 7), amplifier noise (track 7), footsteps (track 8), Moog Minitaur (track 8), water harp (track 9)
- Christian Wargo – vocals (tracks 1, 3), bass (tracks 1, 7, 10, 11), drum kit (track 10)
- Casey Wescott – piano (track 1), chromatic bells (tracks 1, 11), SuperCollider birdsong (track 1), qraqebs (tracks 1, 7), kettledrum (track 2), programming (tracks 1, 2, 7, 11), koto (track 5), harpsichord (track 7), Blue Noise synth (tracks 7, 11)
- Morgan Henderson – cello (tracks 1, 8), qraqebs (tracks 1, 7), double bass (tracks 1, 7), pitched bass clarinet (tracks 1, 11), pitched flute (track 2), pitched clarinet (track 2), alto flute (track 10)

Additional musicians

- Hannah Epperson – violin (tracks 1–3, 5, 11)
- Matthew Barrick – drum kit and percussion (tracks 1–3, 5, 9)
- Christopher Icasiano – drum kit and percussion (tracks 7, 8, 11)
- Neal Morgan – drum kit (bridge of track 1, end of track 8), percussion (track 1)
- Brian McPherson – spoken word (track 1)
- String quartet (tracks 1, 5, 7, 10)
  - Russel Durham – first violin
  - Jeremy Kittel – second violin
  - Nicholas Cords – viola
  - Dave Eggar – cello
  - Jonathan Seale – production
  - Gabriel Gall – arrangement
- The Westerlies – horns
  - Andy Clausen – arrangement, trombone
  - Willem de Koch – trombone
  - Zubin Hensler – trumpet
  - Riley Mulherkar – trumpet

Production

- Robin Pecknold – production
- Skyler Skjelset – production
- Phil Ek – mixing
- Greg Calbi – mastering
- Chris Allen – engineering (Sear Sound)
- Grant Valentine – engineering (Sear Sound)
- Owen Mulholland – engineering (Sear Sound)
- Gabe Wax – engineering (Rare Book Room)
- Casey Wescott – engineering (Avast Recording Company)
- Adam Burd – engineering (Avast Recording Company)
- Gosha Usov – engineering (Electric Lady Studios)
- Beatriz Artola – engineering (Electric Lady Studios)

Design

- Ben Tousley – design and layout
- Robin Pecknold – design and layout
- Shawn Brackbill – band portrait
- Sean Pecknold – paintings
- Adi Goodrich – paintings
- Hiroshi Hamaya – front/back cover and interior photos

== Charts ==
=== Weekly charts ===
| Chart (2017) | Peak position |
|---|---|
| Australian Albums (ARIA) | 10 |
| Austrian Albums (Ö3 Austria) | 29 |
| Belgian Albums (Ultratop Flanders) | 9 |
| Belgian Albums (Ultratop Wallonia) | 24 |
| Canadian Albums (Billboard) | 16 |
| Dutch Albums (Album Top 100) | 11 |
| French Albums (SNEP) | 144 |
| German Albums (Offizielle Top 100) | 25 |
| Irish Albums (IRMA) | 5 |
| Italian Albums (FIMI) | 39 |
| New Zealand Albums (RMNZ) | 15 |
| Norwegian Albums (VG-lista) | 21 |
| Portuguese Albums (AFP) | 11 |
| Spanish Albums (PROMUSICAE) | 30 |
| Swedish Albums (Sverigetopplistan) | 18 |
| Swiss Albums (Schweizer Hitparade) | 26 |
| UK Albums (OCC) | 9 |
| US Billboard 200 | 9 |
| US Top Rock Albums (Billboard) | 3 |

=== Year-end charts ===
| Chart (2017) | Position |
|---|---|
| Belgian Albums (Ultratop Flanders) | 170 |
