= The Crack-Up =

Essay collection by F. Scott Fitzgerald

- First edition cover
- Author: F. Scott Fitzgerald
- Language: English
- Genre: Essays, letters and notes
- Publisher: New Directions
- Publication date: 1945
- Publication place: United States
- Media type: Print (Hardcover, Paperback), and ebook
- Pages: 347 pp

The Crack-Up is a posthumous collection of essays, letters, and notes by American author F. Scott Fitzgerald and compiled by his lifelong friend, Edmund Wilson for publication by New Directions Publishing in 1945. Three of the essays are collected together under the title "The Crack-Up" and were first published in Esquire magazine in 1936. All of the essays were written by Fitzgerald between the years 1931-37. The three essays titled together as "The Crack-Up" were written as Fitzgerald suffered from his nervous breakdown and what he called emotional bankruptcy.

== Background ==
After Fitzgerald's death in 1940, Wilson compiled and edited the writings into an anthology (collected together with letters, to and from Fitzgerald, his notebooks, and tributes to his legacy).

Wilson intended that the collection would "make an autobiographical sequence which vividly puts on record his state of mind and his point of view during the later years of his life."

== Contents ==
- "Echoes of the Jazz Age", first published in Scribner's Magazine, November 1931
- "My Lost City", July 1932
- "Ring", first published in the New Republic, 11 October 1933
- "Show Mr. and Mrs. F. To Number-", May/June, 1934
- "Auction-Model 1934", by Fitzgerald and his wife, Zelda, July 1934
- "Sleeping and Waking", December 1934
- "Lamp in the Window," a poem by Fitzgerald with introductory verses by the editor, first published in The New Yorker in 1935
- "The Crack-Up", February 1936, first published in Esquire
- Collected together under the title The Crack-Up:
  - "The Crack-Up" (originally printed in Esquire magazine, February 1936)
  - "Pasting It Together" (originally printed in Esquire magazine, March 1936)
  - "Handle With Care" (originally printed in Esquire magazine, April 1936) - where Fitzgerald deals with emotional bankruptcy, a theme recurring from The Basil and Josephine Stories which he wrote in 1931.
- "Early Success," October 1937, first published in American Cavalcade
- "The Note-Books
  - Anecdotes
  - Bright Clippings
  - Conversation and Things Overheard
  - Descriptions of Things and Atmosphere
  - Epigrams, Wisecracks and Jokes
  - Feelings and Emotions (without Girls)
  - Description of Girls
  - Descriptions of Humanity (Physical)
  - Ideas
  - Jingles and Songs
  - Karacters
  - Literacy
  - Moments (What People Do)
  - Nonsense and Stray Phrases
  - Observations
  - Rough Stuff
  - Scenes and Situations
  - Titles
  - Unclassified
  - Vernacular
  - Youth and Army
- Letters to Friends
  - To Edmund Wilson, 26 September 1917, from St. Paul, Minnesota: includes the poems "Boudoir" (by John Peale Bishop and "To Cecilia" (incorporated as prose in Book Two, Chapter III, This Side of Paradise)
  - To Edmund Wilson, Autumn of 1917 from Princeton: includes the poem "The Way of Purgation" (appears in slightly different form in Book Two, Chapter V, This Side of Paradise)
  - To Edmund Wilson, 10 January 1917 [1918], from Fort Leavenworth
  - To John V.A. Weaver, 1921, from St. Paul
  - Several more letters to Edmund Wilson and John Peale Bishop from various places
  - To Gerald Murphy, 14 September 1940
  - To Gerald and Sara Murphy
  - To Ernest Hemingway, 8 November 1940
- Letters to Frances Scott Fitzgerald
- Three Letters About The Great Gatsby from Gertrude Stein, Edith Wharton and T.S. Eliot
- A Letter from John Dos Passos
- A Letter from Thomas Wolfe
- F. Scott Fitzgerald by Paul Rosenfeld
- The Moral of Scott Fitzgerald by Glenway Wescott
- A Note On Fitzgerald by John Dos Passos
- The Hours by John Peale Bishop

== Reception ==
Upon initial publication, the essays were poorly received and many reviewers were openly critical, particularly of the extent of Fitzgerald's personal revelations and his admission of his pessimistic outlook.

William DuBois, writing for The New York Times Book Review, was critical of the publication, and of Fitzgerald himself, describing him as "one of those artists who simply lacked the mental equipment to adjust to the demands of maturity", which DuBois believed was reflected in the essays. DuBois continued, writing that "the whole book is crammed with such yearnings" of over-sentimentalism. DuBois summarised the work by stating that "for all their inanities and juvenile posturings, for all their borrowed melancholy and half-formed wisdom, these notes are a blurred but fascinating blueprint of the development – and the breakdown – of a major literary talent".

The San Francisco Chronicle opined that Fitzgerald was feeling "a little too sorry for himself."

Critics have since referred to the collection as "a compelling psychological portrait and an illustration of an important Fitzgerald[ian] theme."

== Legacy ==
French philosopher Gilles Deleuze adopted and further conceptualized the term crack from "The Crack-Up" in The Logic of Sense (Originally in French: Logique du sens, 1969). The title of the 2017 Fleet Foxes album Crack-Up was inspired by these essays. La Fêlure (Julliard, 2026) by Charlotte Casiraghi is a nonfiction work inspired by The Crack-Up and in which she explores emotional vulnerabilities expressed across literature, music, and art.

== Editions (United States & United Kingdom) ==
- Fitzgerald, Francis Scott. The Crack-Up. New Directions Publishing. 1945.
  - New Directions Publishing Corporation, 1993. ISBN 9780811212472
  - New Directions eBook 2009: ISBN 9780811219716
  - New Directions Paperback 2009: ISBN 9780811218207
- The Crack-up: With Other Uncollected Pieces. New Directions, 1956. Reprint 1972.
- The Crack-Up With Other Pieces and Stories. Penguin Books. ISBN 9780140180602
- The Crack-Up and Other Stories. Penguin Modern Classics. ISBN 9780140082098
- The Crack-up, with Other Uncollected Pieces, Note-books and Unpublished Letters: Together with Letters to Fitzgerald from Gertrude Stein, Edith Wharton, T. S. Eliot, Thomas Wolfe, and John Dos Passos; and Essays and Poems. United Kingdom, J. Laughlin, 1956. ISBN 9780811200516
- Illustrated edition. Alma Classics. 2018. ISBN 9781847497185
- Crack-Up. Alma Books, 2018. ISBN 9780714548791
- The Crack-Up, Selections from The Notebooks, Show Mr. and Mrs. F to Number-, Sleeping and Waking, My Lost City, and Selections from the Letters are published in On Booze, New Directions, 2025. New Directions Paperback- NDP1652. ISBN 9780811239943.

== Translations ==
- French: La fêlure. Translated by Roger Grenier and Marc Chénetier. Paris: Editions Gallimard, 2014. ISBN 9782072527906
- French: La Fêlure et autres nouvelles (The Crack-Up and other short stories). Translated by Roger Grenier. Folio Bilingue. 2004. ISBN 9782070304127
- German: Der Knacks. Translated by Walter Schürenberg. Berlin: Merve, 1984. ISBN 9783883960388
  - Includes the essay by Gilles Deleuze, "Porzellan und Vulkan" (English: "Porcelain and the Volcano") that appears in Deleuze's separate work, The Logic of Sense.
- Italian: Il crollo. Translated by Ottavio Fatica. Adelphi Edizioni. 2010. ISBN 9788845924835
- Spanish: El Crack-Up. Translated by Mariano Antolín Rato. Capitán Swing Libros 2012. ISBN 9788493982751
- Spanish: Second Illustrated Edition. Anagrama 1991. ISBN 9788433920416
- Spanish: El Crack-Up. Grupo Planeta. Argentina. 2013. ISBN 9789500435277

== Bibliography ==
- Donaldson, S. (2006). The crisis of Fitzgerald’s “crack-up.” In F. Scott Fitzgerald, Updated Edition. Chelsea House. Infobase
- Rielly, E.J. (2005). Chapter 8 THE CRACK-UP PERIOD: FITZGERALD HITS BOTTOM (1934–1937). In F. Scott Fitzgerald: A Biography (pp. 85–93). Westport, CT: Greenwood. Retrieved May 12, 2026, from Bloomsbury Collection
- Seltzer, C. (2025). “Very Distinctly Not Modern”: Teaching “The Crack-Up” Alongside “Babylon Revisited”. In L. Rattray & L. Wagner-Martin (Ed.). Bloomsbury Handbook to F. Scott Fitzgerald (pp. 383–390). London: Bloomsbury Academic. Retrieved May 12, 2026, from Bloomsbury Collection
- Trilling, L. (2022). F. Scott Fitzgerald (on The crack-up). In Twentieth Century American Literature: F. Scott Fitzgerald. Chelsea House. Infobase
- West, J.L. (2025). Fitzgerald’s Nonfiction. In L. Rattray & L. Wagner-Martin (Ed.). Bloomsbury Handbook to F. Scott Fitzgerald (pp. 233–244). London: Bloomsbury Academic. Retrieved May 12, 2026, from Bloomsbury Collection
