= The Westerlies =

American brass quartet

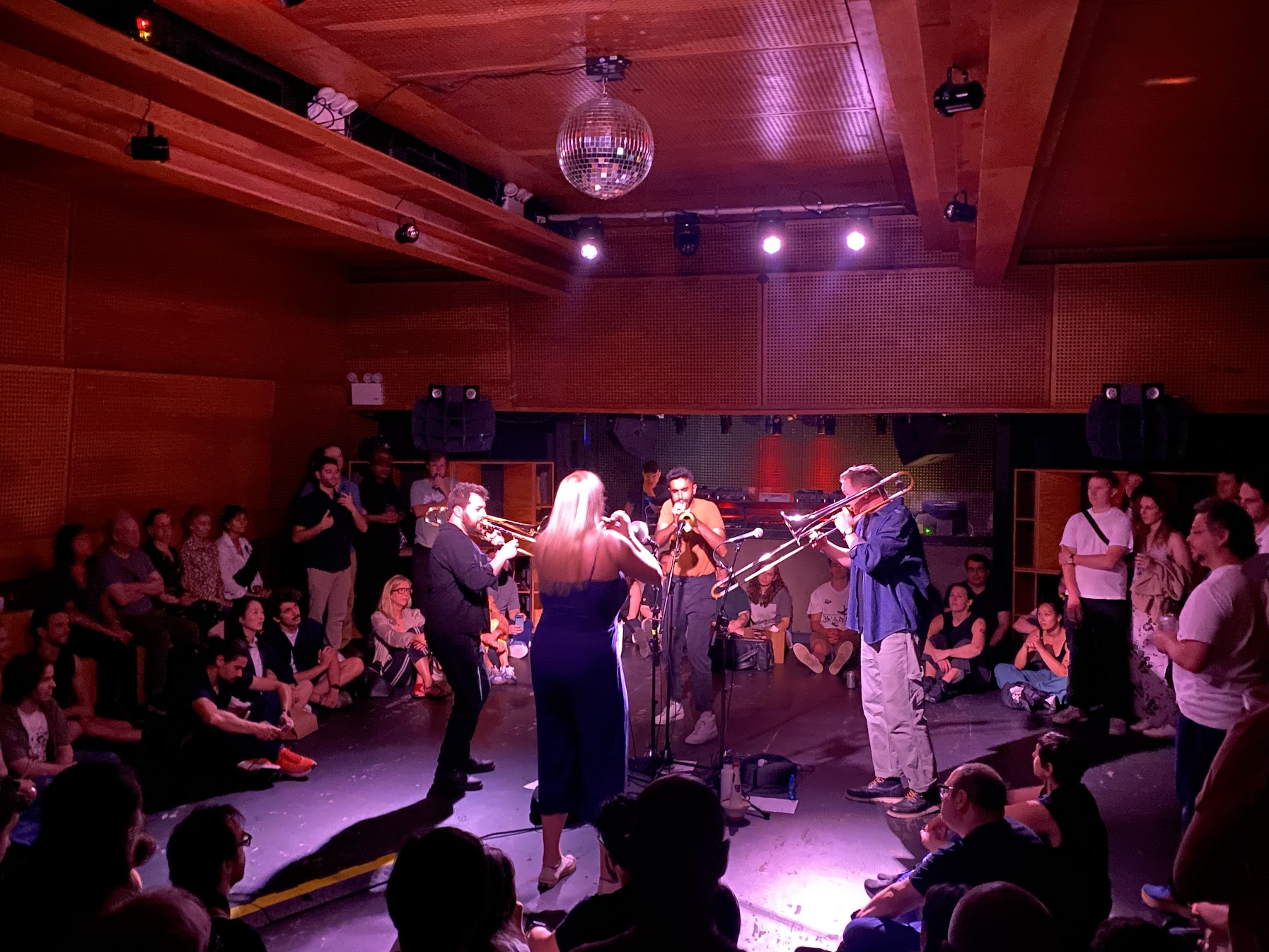
- The Westerlies in 2025

Background information
- Genres: Jazz; contemporary classical; folk
- Instruments: Trumpet; Trombone
- Years active: 2011–present
- Members: Riley Mulherkar; Chloe Rowlands; Andy Clausen; Addison Maye-Saxon
- Past members: Zubin Hensler; Willem de Koch
- Website: westerliesmusic.com

The Westerlies are an American brass quartet. Composed of two trumpets and two trombones, the ensemble is known for taking inspiration from jazz, contemporary classical, and folk music, as well as employing nontraditional sonorities.

== History ==
The group's founding members were originally childhood friends in Seattle, where they attended Garfield High School and Roosevelt High School. Each had a background in jazz performance, and as a high school senior, trombonist Andy Clausen led the ten-piece Split Stream Big Band, in which trumpeter Riley Mulkerhar and trombonist Willem de Koch performed. The group formed in 2011 in New York City as members pursued graduate degrees at the Juilliard School, The New School, and the Manhattan School of Music. It first performed that year at the Royal Room jazz club in Seattle's Columbia City neighborhood.

In May 2018, trumpeter Zubin Hensler left the group to focus on producing and was replaced by Chloe Rowlands. In 2024, trombonist Willem de Koch was replaced by Addison Maye-Saxon.

The group has promoted music education, holding clinics in Seattle schools and others across the United States. In 2021, the group became the inaugural small ensemble-in-residence at The New School's School of Jazz and Contemporary Music.

The Westerlies have been featured on records by Fleet Foxes, Common, and Dave Douglas. The group earned a 2026 Grammy nomination for Best Arrangement, Instrumental or A Cappella, for the track "Fight On" from its 2025 album Paradise.

== Style ==
The Los Angeles Times described the Westerlies' self-titled album (2016) as "a lively territory between jazz, Steven Foster-styled folk and chamber music." The ensemble's style has been compared to Aaron Copland, Bill Frisell, Jimmy Giuffre, and Charles Ives. The group is known for incorporating improvisation as well as widely diverse timbres, leveraging the unconventionality of a two-trumpet, two-trombone ensemble. Its arrangements often register the influence of minimalism, reflecting what Clausen has called a focus on "simplicity" and what composer Wayne Horvitz has described as the group's "egoless" interweaving of voices. Experimentations in tone have included folding tin foil across the bell of a trombone to give it a "restless sibilance".

"Since we can't sing the lyrics, we use timbral variety to express the feeling of the song."

— Andy Clausen, interviewed in Textura

The ensemble has covered music by Arthur Russell, Joni Mitchell, Woody Guthrie, and Robin Holcomb among others, and frequently performs original compositions by the group's members. Collaborations have included work with vocalist Theo Bleckmann and composers Nico Muhly and Sam Amidon.

The ensemble has frequently worked with protest songs and other music with political intent. Its album "This Land" (2021) featured original compositions in response to the Pulse nightclub shooting and Sandy Hook Elementary School shooting as well as traditional spirituals and leftist folk songs.

== Members ==
- Riley Mulherkar, trumpet
- Zubin Hensler, trumpet (2011–2018)
- Chloe Rowlands, trumpet (2018–present)
- Andy Clausen, trombone
- Willem de Koch, trombone (2011–2024)
- Addison Maye-Saxon, trombone (2024–present)

== Discography ==
- Wish The Children Would Come On Home: The Music of Wayne Horvitz (2014)
- The Westerlies (2016)
- Wherein Lies the Good (2020)
- This Land (2021, with Theo Bleckmann)
- Bricolage (2021, with Conrad Tao)
- Songbook Vol. 1 (2021)
- Fireside Brass: A Westerlies Holiday (2021)
- Songbook Vol. 2 (2022)
- Live at TOURISTS (2022)
- Move (2023)
- Paradise (2025)
- Songbook Vol. 3 (2025)
