= Kelly Harrell =

American singer-songwriter

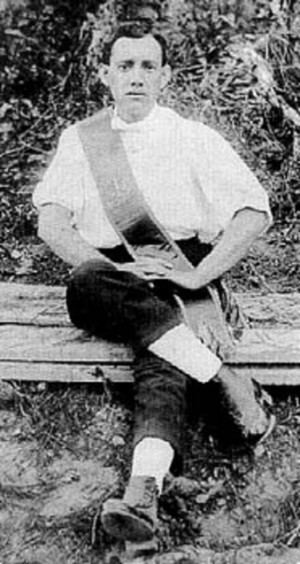

Background information
- Born: September 13, 1889
- Origin: Virginia, United States
- Died: July 9, 1942 (aged 52)
- Genres: Folk
- Years active: 1920s
- Labels: Victor, OKeh

Kelly Harrell (September 13, 1889 – July 9, 1942) was an American country music singer. Beginning his recording career in 1925, Harrell recorded more than a dozen songs for OKeh and Victor Records before the onset of the Great Depression. Harrell was also a songwriter, most notably penning "Away Out on the Mountain," which was recorded by Jimmie Rodgers in 1927, and "The Story of the Mighty Mississippi," which was covered by Ernest Stoneman, also in 1927.

== Biography ==
Harrell was born in Draper's Valley, Wythe County, Virginia and from his early teens worked in various textile mills. In early 1925, when Harrell was already 35 years old, he went to New York City and recorded four tracks for Victor Records, among them "New River Train" (also recorded that year by Henry Whitter, a decade later by Charlie and Bill Monroe) and "The Roving Gambler". He recorded for OKeh later that year, including a version of "The Wreck of the Old 97" and "I Was Born 10,000 Year Ago" (the latter often known as "The Bragging Song" and recorded by Elvis Presley, The New Christy Minstrels, Odetta and several others).

He made more records for Victor in 1925, 1926, 1927 and 1929. "The Butcher's Boy" and "I Wish I Was A Single Girl Again" on Victor 19563 on 1/7/25. "The Dying Hobo" (1926) is a variant of the traditional English folk song "George Collins". "My Name Is John Johannah" was recorded in 1927 at RCA Victor's studios in Camden, NJ, with Posey Rorer on fiddle, Alfred Steagal on guitar and R.D. Hundley on banjo. Bob Dylan used the tune of "John Johannah" as the basis of his song "Long Time Gone". In a prose piece, "For Dave Glover" (Newport Folk Festival programme 1963), Dylan writes: "I can't sing "John Johannah" cause it's his story and his people's story."

After 1929, his recording career came to a halt, owing to his inability to play an instrument — Harrell always required backing by other musicians, and the Great Depression had so damaged the recording business that Victor was unwilling to pay the cost of hiring backup musicians.

Harrell's "My Name Is John Johannah" and “Charles Giteau” appeared on Harry Smith's 1952 compilation Anthology of American Folk Music, which was influential on the 1960s folk revival. Since then, Harrell's complete recorded music has been released on Bear Family's triple-LP set The Complete Kelly Harrell and Document Records' Complete Recorded Works series.
