= Poor Moon (Poor Moon album) =

Studio album by Poor Moon
- Released: 28 August 2012
- Genre: Indie folk, folk rock
- Length: 29:59
- Label: Sub Pop

Poor Moon is the first full-length album released on August 28, 2012 by Seattle based band Poor Moon, and their second release on US label Sub Pop.

A review in Pitchfork magazine called the band "a who's who of acts regional and national".

== Track listing ==
No.	Title	Length
1.	"Clouds Below"	2:22
2.	"Phantom Light"	3:11
3.	"Same Way"	2:46
4.	"Holiday"	2:38
5.	"Waiting For"	2:26
6.	"Heaven's Door"	3:09
7.	"Pulling Me Down"	2:46
8.	"Bucky Pony"	3:25
9.	"Come Home"	3:25
10.	"Birds"	3:51
