= Christian Wargo =

American singer, songwriter and musician (born 1978)

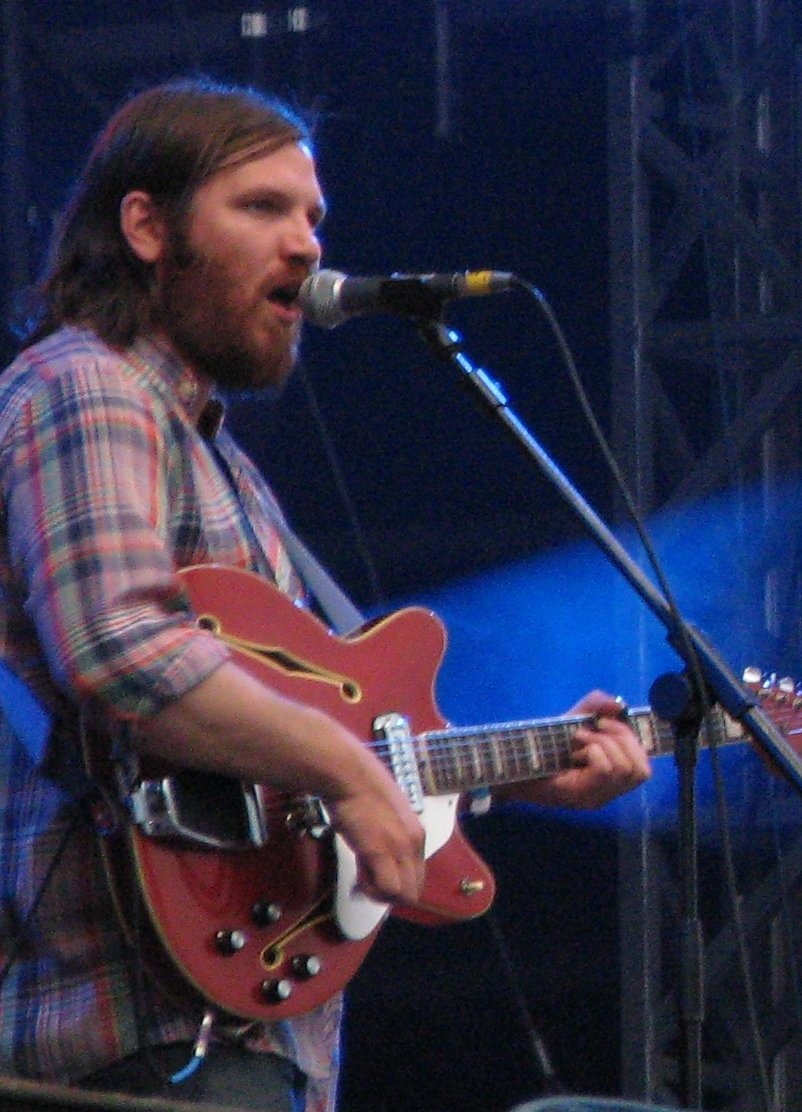
- Wargo performing in 2009

Background information
- Born: September 22, 1976 (age 49)
- Origin: Seattle, Washington, U.S.
- Genres: Indie folk; indie pop; indie rock
- Occupations: Musician; singer; songwriter
- Instruments: Vocals; guitar; bass guitar
- Years active: 2002–present
- Member of: Fleet Foxes; Poor Moon; Crystal Skulls
- Formerly of: Danielson; Pedro the Lion; Scientific

Christian Wargo (born September 22, 1976) is an American musician, singer and songwriter, best known as a member of Fleet Foxes, Poor Moon and Crystal Skulls. He is a former member of Danielson and Pedro the Lion.

== History ==
Wargo's first band, Scientific, released its debut album From the Nest of Idea in 2002 via Burnt Toast Vinyl.

In 2004, he formed Crystal Skulls in Seattle with a lineup comprising drummer Casey Foubert and bass guitarist Yuuki Matthews. They released two albums through Suicide Squeeze and toured the United States with Black Mountain and Helio Sequence.

At the time, Wargo was sharing a practice space with fellow Seattle band Fleet Foxes and in 2007 Wargo joined Fleet Foxes.

In 2012 Wargo released songs written prior to joining Fleet Foxes under the name Poor Moon, released on Sub Pop in the United States and Bella Union in Europe.

In 2014 Wargo revived Crystal Skulls with drummer Aaron Sperske (Father John Misty, Ariel Pink's Haunted Graffiti, Beachwood Sparks, Lilys), Todd Dahlhoff (Electric Guest, Devendra Banhart), George Holdcroft (Daniel Johnston), and Thomas Hunter (Portugal. The Man, The Heavy).

In 2015, Wargo toured as bassist for Nate Mendel of Foo Fighters in support of the album, If I Kill This Thing We're All Going to Eat for a Week, from his solo project, Lieutenant.
