= Fleet Foxes =

American indie folk band

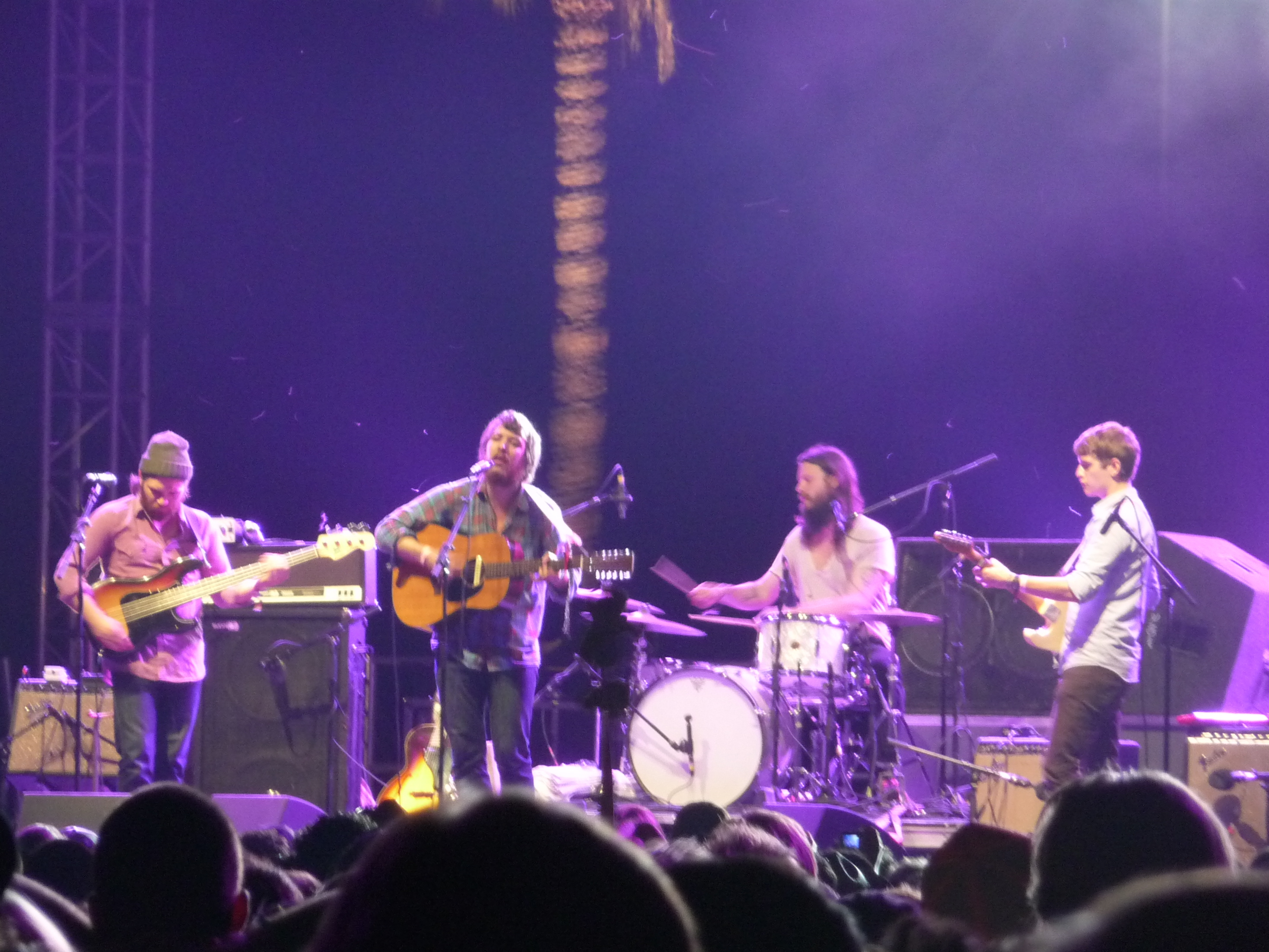
- Fleet Foxes performing at Coachella in 2009

Background information
- Origin: Seattle, Washington, U.S.
- Genres: Indie folk; chamber pop; folk rock; progressive folk
- Years active: 2006–2013; 2016–present
- Labels: Sub Pop; Bella Union; Nonesuch; Anti-
- Members: Robin Pecknold; Skyler Skjelset; Casey Wescott; Christian Wargo; Morgan Henderson
- Past members: Nicholas Peterson; Craig Curran; Bryn Lumsden; Trevor Alderfer; Josh Tillman
- Website: fleetfoxes.co

Fleet Foxes are an American indie folk and folk rock band formed in Seattle, Washington, in 2006. The band currently consists of Robin Pecknold (vocals, guitar), Skyler Skjelset (guitar, mandolin, backing vocals), Casey Wescott (keyboards, mandolin, backing vocals), Christian Wargo (bass, guitar, backing vocals), and Morgan Henderson (upright bass, guitar, woodwinds, violin, percussion, saxophone). Founding members Pecknold and Skjelset have been the only constants through the group's history, with the former serving as leader and principal songwriter.

The band came to prominence in 2008 with the release of their second EP Sun Giant and their eponymous debut album on Sub Pop, both of which met with widespread critical acclaim. Their second album Helplessness Blues (2011) earned further praise and became their greatest commercial success to date, reaching number 4 on the Billboard 200. Following a three-year break, Fleet Foxes reconvened in 2016 to record their third album Crack-Up, which was released the following year on Nonesuch Records. This was followed by 2020's Shore, a de facto Pecknold solo album made without the involvement of his bandmates and released through the Anti- label.

The group's work has been consistently lauded by music critics, who have praised their lyricism and production style and often noted the band's use of refined instrumentation and vocal harmonies. The band's debut album was ranked by Rolling Stone among the best of the decade and was also included in the book 1001 Albums You Must Hear Before You Die. The band has been nominated for two Grammy Awards, the first for Best Folk Album in 2012 for Helplessness Blues and the second for Best Alternative Music Album in 2022 for Shore.

== History ==
=== Formation and early years (2005–06) ===
Robin Pecknold and Skyler Skjelset both attended Lake Washington High School in Kirkland, a suburb of Seattle, and soon became close friends. Pecknold and Skjelset began making music together after bonding over a shared appreciation of Bob Dylan, Neil Young, and Brian Wilson. Their parents influenced their musical tastes early on—Skjelset's mother Peggi was a keen listener to both Dylan and Hank Williams while Pecknold's father Greg was a member of The Fathoms, a local 1960s soul group. Shortly before forming the band, Pecknold played bass for Seattle's Dolour on a US tour in 2005.

Originally going by the name "The Pineapples", a name clash with another local band prompted a change and Pecknold decided upon "Fleet Foxes", suggesting that it was "evocative of some weird English activity like fox hunting". Pecknold took up the role of principal songwriter, both singing and playing guitar, while Skjelset played lead guitar. The original lineup was filled out by Bryn Lumsden on bass, Casey Wescott on keyboards and backing vocals, and Nicholas Peterson on drums and backing vocals.

Pecknold's late-sixties pop style caught the attention of the Seattle producer Phil Ek and he helped them record their first demo in 2006, the self-released Fleet Foxes EP. Ek was impressed with the band's songwriting, and on hearing Pecknold for the first time, noted, "It was obvious he had talent coming out of his ass." By late 2006 the Seattle press began to take notice of the band; Tom Scanlon of the Seattle Times stated that he was impressed with the band's lyrics and musical maturity. By the end of the year, Lumsden had been replaced on bass by Craig Curran, who would also handle many of the band's vocal harmonies.

With growing popularity on the local circuit, the band set about making their first album in early 2007, spending time in the studio with producer Ek in addition to recording material at home. However, funds for recording were tight, so the band members cobbled together what funds they had, which limited the time they had in the studio, and so the majority of the tracks were recorded in various band members' apartments, other spaces, or the basement of Pecknold's parents' house.

=== Sun Giant and Fleet Foxes (2007–08) ===
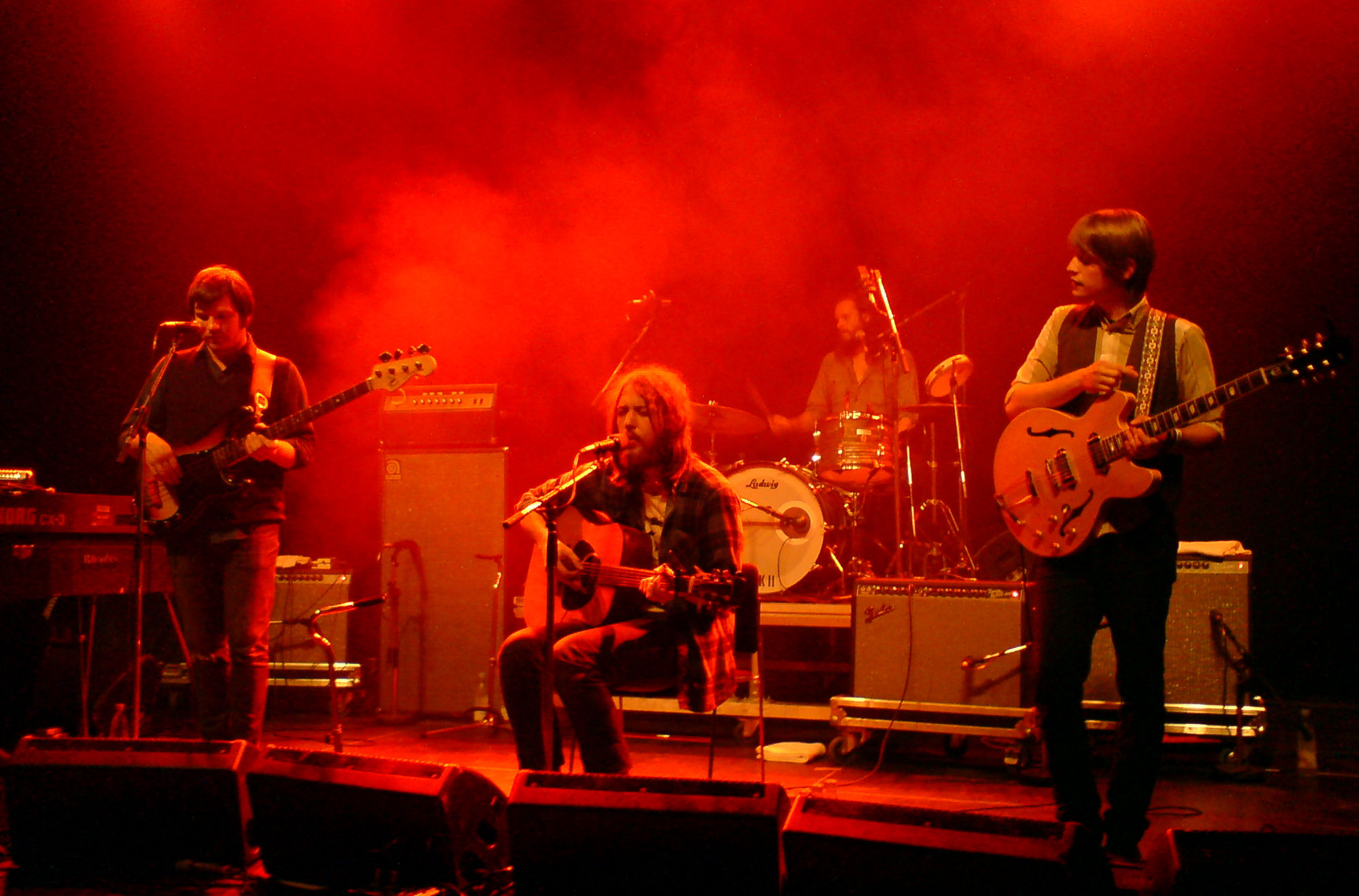
Fleet Foxes performing in Copenhagen, 2008.

Fleet Foxes were becoming increasingly popular and by late 2007, they had attracted over a quarter of a million song plays over two months on their Myspace site. Although the band had not released any of their recordings, they benefited from word of mouth exposure and their success soon translated into a record deal, signing with Warner Music subsidiary record label Sub Pop on January 18, 2008. The band's frontman, Robin Pecknold, attributes much of their success and popularity to illegal file sharing.

The band tracked their second EP, Sun Giant, at Bear Creek Studio and performed overdubs and mixed at Seattle's Avast! Recording Co., around the same time in preparation for upcoming tours. Fleet Foxes began their spring tour with another Northwest band Blitzen Trapper on February 28, 2008. Before the recording of the EP, bassist Curran was replaced by Christian Wargo, whose voice, like that of his predecessor, would become an important part of the band's harmony blend. The band's performances, first at the SXSW festival in March 2008, and then the Sasquatch! festival in May 2008, moved the band into the public consciousness, notably attracting attention from the European press for the first time.

Sun Giant was released internationally on April 8, 2008, and the group's brand of folk, rock and pop, marked by their use of vocal harmonies, was well received by the press. Despite the warm critical reception, the group said that the EP did not represent their full ambitions, serving merely as a CD to sell while on tour. In May 2008, the band chose to extend their North American and European tour until September in support of their forthcoming album. At this time Josh Tillman replaced Peterson on drums and backing vocals. Their first full-length album, Fleet Foxes, was released shortly afterwards on June 3, 2008. The album achieved similar critical success as the previous EP. Fleet Foxes received four out of five stars from Rolling Stone, which compared it to the likes of the Beach Boys, Animal Collective, and Crosby, Stills & Nash, and a 9.0 out of 10 in a review by Pitchfork Media, sharing the website's album of the year rank with the Sun Giant EP. The Guardian was particularly complimentary, awarding the album five stars and declaring it "a landmark in American music — an instant classic". On June 24, 2008, Fleet Foxes went to No. 1 on the CMJ Radio 200 Chart. The album achieved an average rating of 87/100 from 30 critic reviews on the aggregator website Metacritic.

While the group enjoyed moderate success in the United States, Fleet Foxes was better received in Europe, selling over 200,000 copies in the five months following its release. The sales were matched with critical plaudits and their debut album won Uncut's first ever Music Award 2008 prize. Uncut's editor, Allan Jones, said the album "showed impeccable musicianship, and although you could trace its antecedents, it sounded totally unique. Fleet Foxes was just a glorious debut." The band sold out music venues for their tours of Australia, New Zealand and the United Kingdom, reaffirming their growing popularity.

At the end of 2008, Fleet Foxes was rated album of the year by Billboard's Critic's Choice and in Metacritic's end of year best album round-up it appeared in 17 lists, topping six of them. Furthermore, it had sold over 408,000 copies in North America and over 100,000 copies in the United Kingdom, making it the first gold certificate record for UK label Bella Union. Their growing profile enabled the band to make televised appearances, playing on Saturday Night Live in January 2009. In 2009, they toured in Europe to favorable reviews; the Dutch newspaper De Volkskrant said their show in Paradiso induced goosebumps. In 2008 and 2009, the band played globally ending the tour in September with a final European leg.

=== Helplessness Blues (2009–12) ===
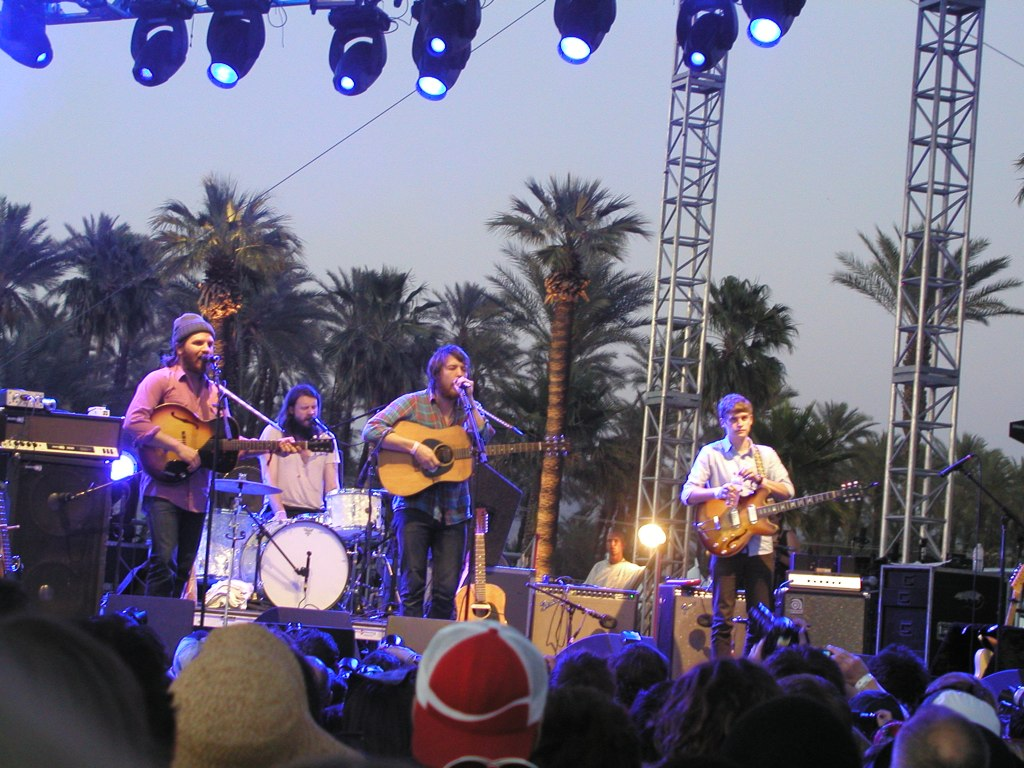
Fleet Foxes performing at the 2009 Coachella Festival.

Pecknold said that he would have liked the album to be released in 2009; however, the band's touring schedule delayed rehearsals of the new songs until February 2009. These sessions took place in a rented house outside Seattle, but were mostly scrapped, losing the band $60,000 of their own money. Further delays ensued because the drummer, Tillman, was scheduled to play a solo tour in Europe and North America throughout the 2009–10 winter. Pecknold later sent some demos to producer Phil Ek and expressed the hope that the second LP would emerge in late 2010.

In December 2009, Pecknold said he wanted the new LP to sound "less poppy, less upbeat and more groove-based". He referenced the 12-string guitar sound from Roy Harper's folk album Stormcock, saying, "That will be the primary sonic distancing from the last record." He wanted the band to record very quickly, with "vocal takes in one go, so even if there are fuck-ups, I want them to be on there. I want there to be guitar mistakes. I want there to be not totally flawless vocals. I want to record it and have that kind of cohesive sound. Van Morrison's Astral Weeks, to me, is the best-sounding album because it sounds like there were only six hours in the universe for that album to be recorded in. So I want it to have that feeling." The band eventually began recording in April 2010 in various locations (including West Hurley, New York) under the label Reciprocal Recording and decided to scrap the earlier idea of a fast recording (though according to the band many of the initial vocals were done in one take). The album features a new six-piece band line up, with the addition of the former Blood Brothers bassist Morgan Henderson on upright bass and woodwind instruments.

The album, Helplessness Blues, was released on May 3, 2011, with a cover illustrated by the Seattle artist Toby Liebowitz and painted by Christopher Alderson. The title track was released via free download on January 31, 2011, and the album's fourth track, "Battery Kinzie", was premiered in the UK on Zane Lowe's radio show on March 22, 2011. The Sub Pop record label released a downloadable music video of the track "Grown Ocean", with footage of the album's recording, on its website in support of the album. A 12" vinyl double A-side single of "Helplessness Blues" and "Grown Ocean" was released for Record Store Day on April 16, 2011. On November 1, 2011, Pecknold's brother, Sean Pecknold, released the official music video for "The Shrine / An Argument".

Helplessness Blues was nominated as Best Folk Album at the 2012 Grammy Awards, held February 12, 2012.

=== Departure of Tillman and hiatus (2012–2016) ===
On January 18, 2012, after the band had finished touring for the album, drummer Tillman announced that he had left the band. He would go on to reinvent himself and record several albums as Father John Misty, notable for his ironic sense of humor in lyrics and media as well as often criticizing both the record industry and society in interviews and on stage. Pecknold would later reflect on Tillman's departure during a Reddit AMA in October 2020:

[Tillman] "quit" the band after recording drums for Helplessness, got into narcotics and made his first [Father John Misty] album while I was making Helplessness in Seattle. Then Sub Pop offered to put out his album, but only if he delayed it for a year or so and toured Helplessness with us. Which we all weakly agreed to going through with, but it quickly became obvious he'd rather have just been doing that project instead, and I would have rathered that as well. So that tour I had to endure being around a lot of substance abuse, sabotaged shows, just general ill treatment, shit-talking, all while paying him for songs he didn't have anything to do with. It sucked!

On June 15, 2013, an image of a home recording set-up—including a laptop computer, microphone and guitar—was posted on the Fleet Foxes Facebook page with the caption "Step one." On June 16, 2013, an image of a broken mandolin with the caption "Step two" was posted. These images were later deleted, but led to speculation that the group was working on a new project, possibly a third studio album. On April 23, 2014, Robin Pecknold posted to the band's Facebook page that he had moved to New York to get his undergraduate degree at the Columbia University School of General Studies, a liberal arts college of Columbia University in New York City.

=== Crack-Up (2016–2018) ===
On May 18, 2016, while answering fan questions on his Instagram account, Pecknold confirmed that Fleet Foxes were working on new material with drummer and frequent collaborator Neal Morgan, best known for his work with Joanna Newsom and Bill Callahan. Describing Morgan as a "full Fox", Pecknold also admitted he "had to up my songwriting game for homeboy." However, when Pecknold posted a photo of the band minus Morgan on Instagram, he clarified that Morgan was one of three drummers involved in the new album, and that for the time being Fleet Foxes would consist of Pecknold, Skjelset, Wescott, Wargo, and Henderson as a "five-piece 'core band'", but they would still use a drummer for live performances and additional musicians for certain shows. Pecknold also said that the new material would be "a different vibe" compared to Fleet Foxes' previous output. On November 14, 2016, the band confirmed (via their Facebook account) that their new album was nearly complete.

On December 25, 2016, Pecknold posted a photo on his Instagram account which showed four albums in the Fleet Foxes' queue in his iTunes library: the first studio album Fleet Foxes; the Sun Giant EP; the second studio album Helplessness Blues; and an unknown third album entitled Ylajali. This led to speculation that the band's third album would: 1) be named after a character from Knut Hamsun's novel Hunger; 2) contain a photo from Japanese photographer Hiroshi Hamaya as the cover art; and 3) be released through Nonesuch Records, since the label's logo can be seen on the album cover.

In an email newsletter on January 1, 2017, production company Mason Jar Music confirmed that Fleet Foxes was working on a new album, since they contributed to the production. The album was called Crack-Up, after an F. Scott Fitzgerald essay of the same name. The album is a concept album and was recorded at Electric Lady Studios and Sear Sound in New York City.

On March 7, 2017, Fleet Foxes announced their third studio album, Crack-Up, released on June 16, 2017, via Nonesuch Records, a new label for the band. The lead single, "Third of May / Ōdaigahara", was released the same day. On April 4, 2017, the band posted the album trailer for the new album on YouTube. The trailer briefly presents various songs from the album and shows some images while they were recording them. The video was made by Sean Pecknold, Robin's brother.

On May 15, 2017, Fleet Foxes made their live return at the Wilma Theatre in Missoula, in which they performed nine songs from Crack-Up along with a selection of older material and a cover of "In the Morning" by Bee Gees. The band's live line-up included Matt Barrick of The Walkmen, who was also the most heavily featured of the three guest drummers who contributed to Crack-Up. Barrick did not become an official member. The new album also included the sounds of a brass quartet called The Westerlies.

On October 10, 2017, the band announced the release of a new EP, entitled The Electric Lady Session, for Black Friday Record Store Day 2017. The EP was released on November 24 of that year, and is a collection of live performances of four songs from Crack-Up, originally recorded for their session at Fordham University's radio station WFUV. For Record Store Day 2018, the band released another EP, entitled "Crack Up (Choral Version)"/"In The Morning (Live in Switzerland)", in collaboration with the Icelandic female choir, Graduale Nobili.

=== Shore (2019–2022) ===
Work began on a fourth studio album in late 2018, not long after the Crack-Up tour finished. On December 31, 2018, Pecknold teased several new demos online for an upcoming new album.

Recording began in September 2019 at Long Pond Studios in Hudson, New York, and continued at other studios including Electro-Vox Recording Studios in Los Angeles. Pecknold collaborated closely with recording engineer Beatriz Artola during the recording process. Upon the outset of the COVID-19 pandemic, Pecknold moved to New York City to be able to continue working with Artola. At this point, the majority of the music of the album was well-conceptualized, but the lyrics eluded Pecknold. He eventually developed the lyrics in part over the course of long drives in the New York countryside, and worked to finish the album in July and August 2020. Due to a desire to release the album quickly, Pecknold did not enlist the help of bandmates Skjelset, Wescott, Wargo, or Henderson.

The album was announced in September 2020; titled Shore, it was released on September 22. The album received universal acclaim, scoring 87/100 on Metacritic, and was listed among the best albums of the year by numerous publications. It was nominated for Best Alternative Music Album at the 64th Annual Grammy Awards.

On December 6, 2021, Fleet Foxes announced the release of a new live album entitled A Very Lonely Solstice. The album was released digitally on December 10, 2021. Vinyl and CD releases are scheduled for release in spring 2022 through Anti-. A Very Lonely Solstice is a recording of a virtual, pre-recorded video concert performance that was livestreamed at 9pm ET on December 21, 2020, coinciding with the winter solstice. The concert featured Pecknold performing an acoustic solo set inside the St. Ann & the Holy Trinity Church in Brooklyn. The album features performances of songs from Shore and older Fleet Foxes songs, as well as cover versions of two tracks.

Following the end of the Shore tour, the band performed a livestreamed concert on September 22, 2022, the second anniversary of Shore's release and in celebration of the Autumn equinox. The concert was held at Leader Bank Pavilion in Boston. The concert film was released on YouTube on December 14 with the title Live on Boston Harbor.

== Members ==
=== Current members ===
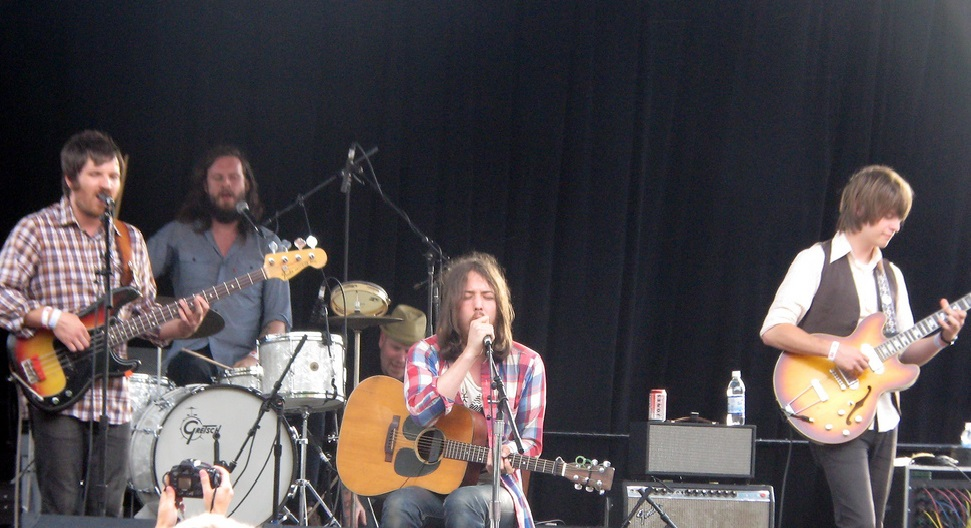
Fleet Foxes performing in Seattle, 2008.

- Robin Pecknold – lead vocals, guitar (2006–present)
- Skyler Skjelset – guitar, mandolin, backing vocals (2006–present)
- Casey Wescott – keyboards, mandolin, backing vocals (2006–present)
- Christian Wargo – bass guitar, guitar, backing vocals (2008–present)
- Morgan Henderson – upright bass, guitar, woodwind, violin, percussion (2010–present)

==== Current touring musicians ====
- Christopher Icasiano – drums, percussion, backing vocals (2022–present)

=== Former members ===
- Bryn Lumsden – bass guitar, backup vocals (2006)
- Craig Curran – bass guitar, backing vocals (2006–2008)
- Nicholas Peterson – drums, percussion, backing vocals (2006–2008)
- Josh Tillman – drums, percussion, backing vocals (2008–2012)

==== Former touring musicians ====
- Matt Barrick – drums, percussion (2017–2018)

== Discography ==
=== Albums ===
- Fleet Foxes (2008)
- Helplessness Blues (2011)
- Crack-Up (2017)
- Shore (2020)

=== Live albums ===
- A Very Lonely Solstice (2021)
- Live on Boston Harbor (2022)

=== EPs ===
- The Fleet Foxes (2006)
- Sun Giant (2008)

=== Compilation albums ===
- First Collection 2006–2009 (2018)
