= Robin Pecknold =

American singer-songwriter (born 1986)

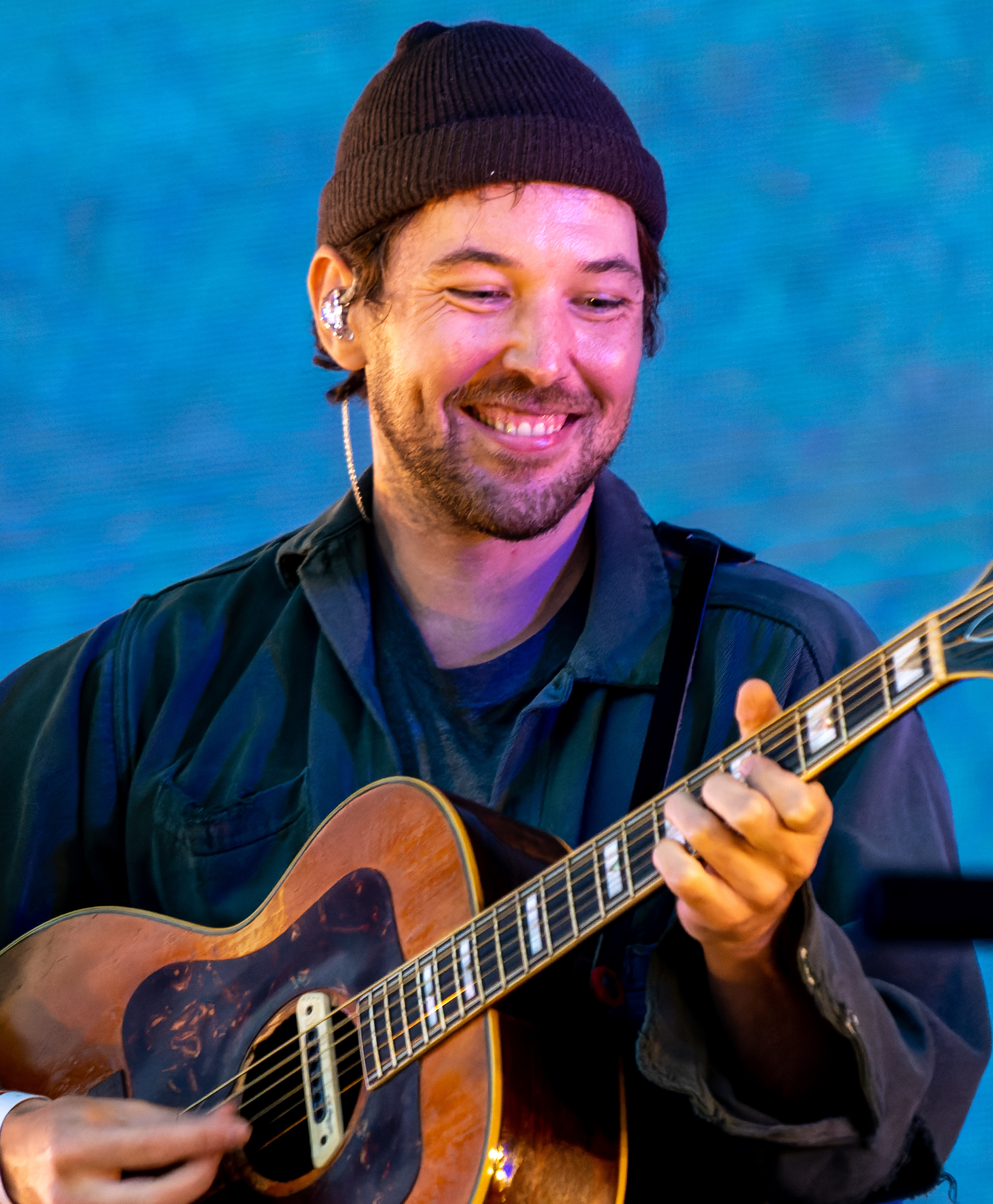
- Pecknold performing in 2022

Background information
- Also known as: Robin Noel Vaas; White Antelope
- Born: Robin Noel Pecknold; March 30, 1986 (age 40); Seattle, Washington, U.S.
- Genre: Indie folk
- Occupation: Singer-songwriter
- Instruments: Vocals; guitar
- Years active: 2000s–present
- Member of: Fleet Foxes

Robin Noel Pecknold (born March 30, 1986) is an American singer-songwriter, who serves as the principal songwriter and vocalist for indie folk band Fleet Foxes, with whom he has recorded four studio albums. He is known for his distinct baritenor voice and introspective lyrics.

== Biography ==
Robin Pecknold was born in Seattle in 1986, the youngest of three children. His maternal great-grandfather, Theodor Valaas, immigrated to Seattle from Norway in 1905. Pecknold's father, Greg, played in Seattle-based soul band The Fathoms in the 1960s and has since worked as a film editor. Both of Pecknold's siblings work closely with Fleet Foxes--his sister Aja as manager and his brother Sean as music video director.

Pecknold has stated that he used Napster to discover much of the music he listened to growing up. His influences range from Joni Mitchell to Brian Wilson.

At the age of 14, Pecknold wrote his first song, "Sarah Jane," about a runaway who turns to prostitution. Under the alias Robin Noel Vaas, he released the song, along with six others, on a demo CD called St. Vincent Street around his hometown. In 2005, he toured with Seattle's Dolour, playing bass, before forming Fleet Foxes with childhood friend Skyler Skjelset in 2006. They played their original music at local open mic nights, teen centers, and coffee shops. He reportedly ran up considerable debt setting up the band, although he has since denied this.

In 2013, Pecknold relocated to New York City and enrolled as an undergraduate student in the Columbia University School of General Studies, majoring in English. He has spoken positively of his decision to take a hiatus from music in order to pursue a traditional education, although he left in 2016 to tour with Joanna Newsom and as of 2022 has not yet finished his degree.

=== Solo work ===
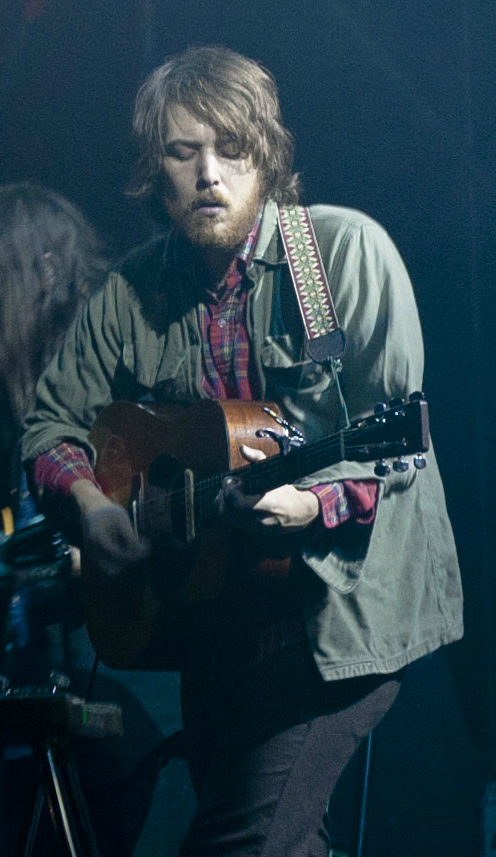
Pecknold in 2011

In 2011, Pecknold released a solo EP entitled Three Songs via Twitter. The release included two original songs, one a duet with Ed Droste, and a cover of New Zealand folk-singer Chris Thompson's "Where Is My Wild Rose?". He has used the moniker White Antelope for releasing covers of traditional songs including "Silver Dagger", "Wild Mountain Thyme," and "False Knight on the Road".

=== Collaborations ===
On October 22, 2013, Pecknold appeared on Late Night with Jimmy Fallon to perform a cover of Pearl Jam's "Corduroy" with Grizzly Bear guitarist Daniel Rossen and drummer Neal Morgan. In 2014, he embarked on a brief tour as part of The Gene Clark No Other Band, a supergroup consisting of himself, Iain Matthews, Victoria Legrand, Daniel Rossen, and Hamilton Leithauser performing Gene Clark's No Other in its entirety.

In 2021, Pecknold, along with Anaïs Mitchell, co-wrote and performed "Phoenix" for How Long Do You Think It's Gonna Last?, the second album by Big Red Machine, itself a collaboration between Bon Iver's Justin Vernon and The National's Aaron Dessner.

=== Scoring ===
In 2012, Pecknold, along with Morgan Henderson and Neal Morgan, recorded music for Sara Lamm and Mary Wigmore's film about Ina May Gaskin, Birth Story: Ina May Gaskin and the Farm Midwives. In 2015, Pecknold composed the score for an Off-Broadway play, Wyoming, written by his cousin Brian Watkins.

== Instruments ==
Pecknold plays a Martin D-18 six-string guitar for most Fleet Foxes work. He also uses a Martin D12-35 twelve-string and a Gibson CF-100 six-string. Both of these guitars date back to the 1960s. He has also been known to use a recent Epiphone Casino electric guitar, and a Fylde Oberon acoustic guitar.

== Discography ==
=== As White Antelope ===
- False Knight on the Road (2009)

=== As Robin Pecknold ===
- Three Songs (2011)
- Birth Story: Ina May Gaskin and the Farm Midwives (soundtrack) (2012)
- Spirit Untamed (Original Motion Picture Soundtrack) (2021)
