= Fleet Foxes discography =

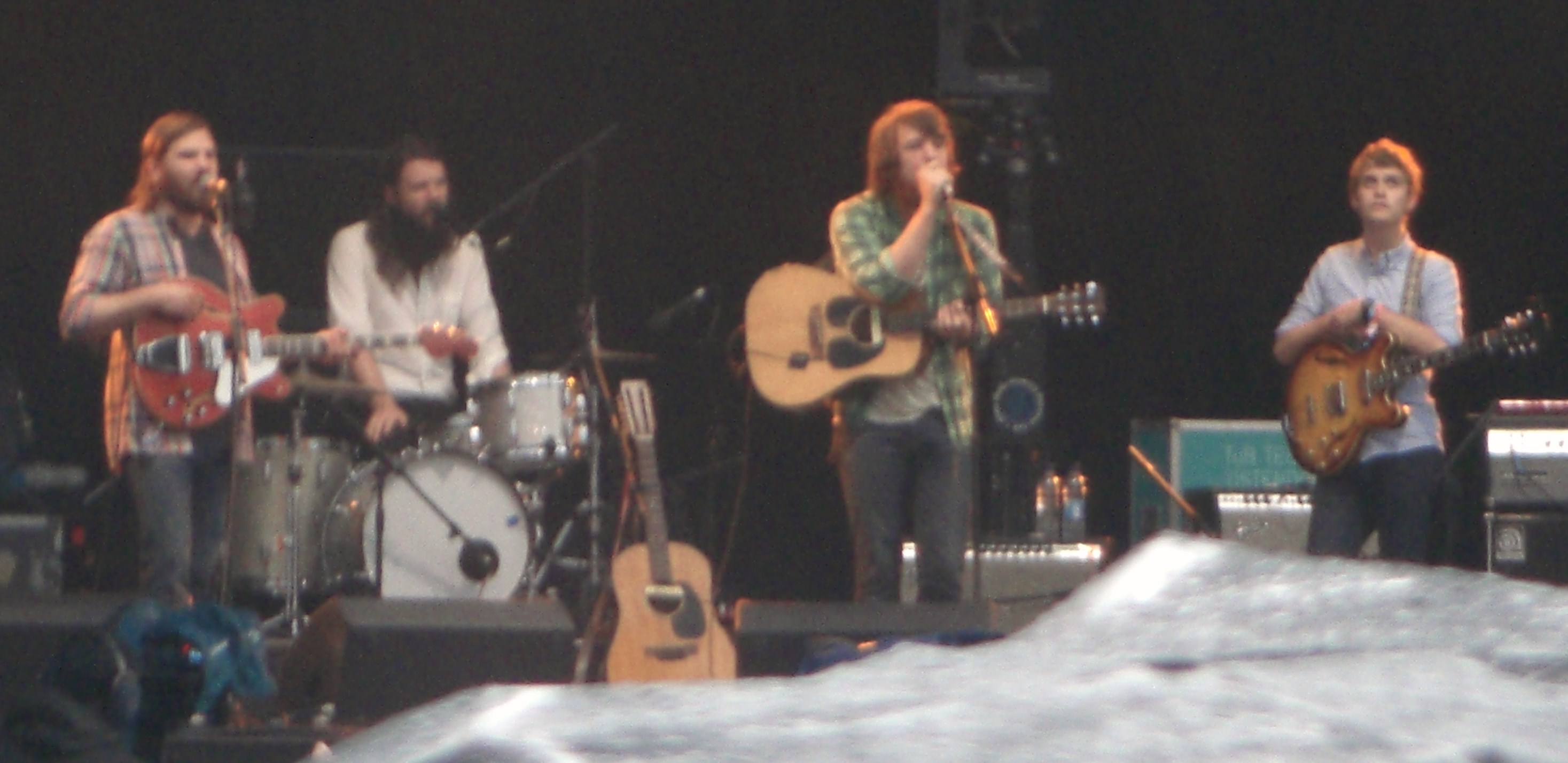
- Fleet Foxes performing at Hard Rock Calling 2009.
- Studio albums: 4
- EPs: 3
- Singles: 9
- Music videos: 6

The discography of Fleet Foxes, a Seattle-based indie folk and folk rock band, consists of four studio albums, three extended plays (EP), and nine singles. Fleet Foxes was formed in 2006 by vocalist Robin Pecknold and guitarist Skyler Skjelset, and were then joined by keyboardist Casey Wescott, bassist Bryn Lumsden, and drummer Nicholas Peterson.

With producer Phil Ek, the band recorded their first demo in 2006, the self-released Fleet Foxes EP. The group subsequently signed with acclaimed UK indie label Bella Union in Europe and Warner Music subsidiary record label Sub Pop for the US, early in 2008. The band's performance at the South by Southwest festival in March caught the attention of the international press; a month later, Fleet Foxes released their second EP, Sun Giant, to critical acclaim. Their first full-length album, Fleet Foxes, was released in June and peaked at number three in the United Kingdom, where it was certified platinum. The album was also certified gold in the US. "Mykonos", a single from Sun Giant, was released in 2009 and reached the top 20 in Belgium and Scotland, and peaked at 51 in the UK.

Fleet Foxes' second album, Helplessness Blues, was released in 2011 and entered the top 10 in the US, Australia, Belgium, Canada, the Netherlands, Norway, Sweden, and the UK. It was nominated in the Best Folk Album category at the 54th Annual Grammy Awards. After a six-year hiatus, Fleet Foxes released a lyric video for the song "Third of May / Ōdaigahara" in March 2017. The band's third studio album, Crack-Up, was released June 16, 2017 on Nonesuch Records. On September 22, 2020, their fourth album, Shore, was released via Anti- Records at exactly 13:31 UCT to coincide with the September equinox.

== Albums ==
=== Studio albums ===
List of studio albums, with selected chart positions, sales, and certifications
Title	Album details	Peak chart positions										Sales	Certifications
Title	Album details	US	AUS	BEL (FL)	CAN	GER	IRE	NLD	NOR	SWE	UK	Sales	Certifications
Fleet Foxes	Released: June 3, 2008; Labels: Bella Union, Sub Pop; Format: CD, CS, LP, digital download	36	90	12	—	51	23	39	14	16	3	US: 500,000 (Note: United States sales figures for Fleet Foxes as of December 2013.); UK: 400,000 (Note: United Kingdom sales figures for Fleet Foxes as of August 2009.)	RIAA: Platinum; BPI: Platinum; BRMA: Gold
Helplessness Blues	Released: May 3, 2011; Labels: Bella Union, Sub Pop; Format: CD, CS, LP, digital download	4	6	2	8	11	3	5	1	3	2	US: 348,000 (Note: United States sales figures for Helplessness Blues as of March 2013.); UK: 134,000 (Note: United Kingdom sales figures for Helplessness Blues as of January 2012.)	RIAA: Gold; BPI: Gold
Crack-Up	Released: June 16, 2017; Labels: Nonesuch; Format: CD, LP, digital download	9	10	9	16	25	5	11	21	18	9	US: 32,000	
Shore	Released: September 22, 2020; Labels: Anti-; Format: CD, LP, digital download	28	13	3	81	5	16	16	—	54	5		
"—" denotes releases that did not chart.

=== Live albums ===
List of live albums, with selected chart positions
Title	Album details	Peak chart positions				
Title	Album details	BEL (FL)	SCO	SPA Vinyl	SWI	UK Indie
A Very Lonely Solstice	Released: December 10, 2021; Labels: Anti-; Format: CD, LP, and digital download; Live solo and acoustic set at the St. Ann & the Holy Trinity Church.; Streamed on the December 21, 2020 winter solstice	104	35	45	57	8
Live on Boston Harbor	Released: April 20, 2024; Labels: Anti-; Format: LP and digital download; Recorded live at Leader Bank Pavilion on August 10, 2022.; Released as Record Store Day 2024 exclusive	—	—	—	—	—
"—" denotes releases that did not chart.

=== Compilation albums ===
List of compilation albums, with selected chart positions
Title	Album details	Peak chart positions
Title	Album details	US
First Collection 2006–2009	Released: November 9, 2018; Label: Sub Pop; Format: CD, LP, digital download	— (Note: First Collection 2006–2009 did not enter the US Billboard 200 chart, but peaked at number 96 on the Current Album Sales chart.)
"—" denotes releases that did not chart.

== Extended plays ==
List of extended plays, with selected chart positions
Title	EP details	Peak chart positions	
Title	EP details	US	UK
The Fleet Foxes	Released: September 5, 2006; Labels: Self-released; Format: CD-R	—	—
Sun Giant	Released: April 8, 2008; Labels: Bella Union, Sub Pop; Formats: CD, CS, LP, digital download	170	— (Note: Sun Giant did not enter the UK Albums Chart, but peaked at number 12 on the UK Budget Album chart.)
The Shrine / An Argument – Live at the BBC	Released: December 13, 2011; Label: Bella Union; Format: 12-inch vinyl	—	—
"—" denotes releases that did not chart.

== Singles ==
=== As lead artist ===
List of singles as lead artist, with selected chart positions and certifications, showing year released and album name
Title	Year	Peak chart positions										Certifications	Album
Title	Year	US Rock	BEL	ICE	JPN	MEX Air.	POL	POR	SCO	UK	UK Indie	Certifications	Album
"White Winter Hymnal"	2008	—	— (Note: "White Winter Hymnal" did not enter the Flemish Ultratop chart, but peaked at number 12 on the Ultratip chart.)	—	80	—	36	—	35	77	4	RIAA: Platinum; BPI: Silver	Fleet Foxes
"He Doesn't Know Why"	2008	—	— (Note: "He Doesn't Know Why" did not enter the Flemish Ultratop chart, but peaked at number 24 on the Ultratip chart.)	—	—	—	—	—	—	—	—		Fleet Foxes
"Mykonos"	2009	— (Note: "Mykonos" did not enter the Rock Songs chart, but peaked at number 30 on the Triple A Airplay chart.)	18	—	—	47	36	—	12	51	28	RIAA: Platinum; BPI: Gold	Sun Giant EP
"Your Protector"	2009	—	—	—	—	—	—	—	31	— (Note: "Your Protector" did not enter the UK Singles Chart, but peaked at number 33 on the UK Physical Singles Chart.)	45		Fleet Foxes
"Helplessness Blues"	2011	—	— (Note: "Helplessness Blues" did not enter the Flemish Ultratop chart, but peaked at number 13 on the Ultratip chart.)	—	76	41	41	—	—	— (Note: "Helplessness Blues" did not enter the UK Singles Chart, but peaked at number 12 on the UK Physical Singles Chart.)	43		Helplessness Blues
"Grown Ocean"	2011	—	—	—	—	36	—	—	—	—	—		Helplessness Blues
"Battery Kinzie"	2011	— (Note: "Battery Kinzie" did not enter the Rock Songs chart, but peaked at number 47 on the Rock Digital Songs chart.)	— (Note: "Battery Kinzie" did not enter the Flemish Ultratop chart, but peaked at number 25 on the Ultratip chart.)	—	—	—	—	50	—	—	33		Helplessness Blues
"Lorelai"	2011	—	— (Note: "Lorelai" did not enter the Flemish Ultratop chart, but peaked at number 18 on the Ultratip chart.)	—	—	35	—	—	—	—	—		Helplessness Blues
"The Shrine / An Argument"	2011	—	—	—	—	—	—	—	—	— (Note: "The Shrine / An Argument" did not enter the UK Singles Chart, but peaked at number 35 on the UK Physical Singles Chart Top 100.)	—		Helplessness Blues
"Third of May / Ōdaigahara"	2017	45	— (Note: "Third of May / Ōdaigahara" did not enter the Flemish Ultratop chart, but charted as an "extra tip" on the Ultratip chart.)	8	—	—	—	—	—	—	—		Crack-Up
"Fool's Errand"	2017	—	— (Note: "Fool's Errand" did not enter the Flemish Ultratop chart, but peaked at number 46 on the Ultratip chart.)	14	—	—	—	—	—	—	—		Crack-Up
"If You Need To, Keep Time on Me"	2017	—	—	—	—	—	—	—	—	—	—		Crack-Up
"On Another Ocean (January / June)"	2017	—	— (Note: "On Another Ocean (January / June)" did not enter the Flemish Ultratop chart, but charted as an "extra tip" on the Ultratip chart.)	—	—	—	—	—	—	—	—		Crack-Up
"Cassius, – Naiads, Cassadies"	2017	—	—	—	—	—	—	—	—	— (Note: "Cassius, – Naiads, Cassadies" did not enter the UK Singles Chart, but peaked at number 4 on the UK Physical Singles Chart.)	—		The Electric Lady Session EP
"Crack-Up (Choral Version)"	2018	—	—	—	—	—	—	—	—	— (Note: "Crack-Up" did not enter the UK Singles Chart, but peaked at number 44 on the UK Physical Singles Chart.)	—		Non-album single
"Can I Believe You"	2020	— (Note: "Can I Believe You" did not enter the Rock Songs chart, but peaked at number 37 on the Rock Airplay chart.)	— (Note: "Can I Believe You" did not enter the Flemish Ultratop chart, but peaked at number 5 on the Ultratip chart.)	5	—	—	—	—	—	— (Note: "Can I Believe You" did not enter the UK Singles Chart, but peaked at number 58 on the UK Singles Sales Chart.)	—		Shore
"Sunblind"	2020	— (Note: "Sunblind" did not enter the Rock Songs chart, but peaked at number 28 on the Triple A Airplay chart.)	— (Note: "Sunblind" did not enter the Flemish Ultratop chart, but peaked at number 27 on the Ultratip chart.)	—	—	—	—	—	—	—	—		Shore
"Don't Put It All on Me" (with Noah Cyrus)	2025	—	—	—	—	—	—	—	—	—	—		I Want My Loved Ones to Go with Me
"—" denotes a recording that did not chart or was not released in that territory.

=== As featured artist ===
List of singles as featured artist, with selected chart positions, showing year released and album name
Title	Year	Peak chart positions	Album
Title	Year	US AAA	Album
"Phoenix" (Big Red Machine featuring Fleet Foxes and Anaïs Mitchell)	2021	33	How Long Do You Think It's Gonna Last?

== Other charted or certified songs ==
List of songs, with selected chart positions and certifications, showing year released and album name
Title	Year	Peak chart positions			Certifications	Album
Title	Year	US	CAN	WW	Certifications	Album
"Blue Ridge Mountains"	2008	—	—	—	RIAA: Gold	Fleet Foxes
"Love/Hate Letter to Alcohol" (Post Malone featuring Fleet Foxes)	2022	70	55	89		Twelve Carat Toothache
"—" denotes a recording that did not chart or was not released in that territory.

== Guest appearances ==
List of non-single guest appearances, showing other artist(s), year released and album name
Title	Year	Other artist(s)	Album
"Love/Hate Letter to Alcohol"	2022	Post Malone	Twelve Carat Toothache
"Don't Put It All on Me"	2025	Noah Cyrus	TBA

== Music videos ==
=== Traditional videos ===
List of music videos, with directors, showing year released
Title	Year	Director(s)
"White Winter Hymnal"	2008	Sean Pecknold
"He Doesn't Know Why"	2008	Sean Pecknold
"Mykonos"	2009	Sean Pecknold
"Grown Ocean"	2011	Sean Pecknold
"The Shrine / An Argument"	2011	Sean Pecknold
"Fool's Errand"	2017	Sean Pecknold
"I Am All That I Need / Arroyo Seco / Thumbprint Scar"	2018	Sean Pecknold

=== Lyric videos ===
List of music videos, with creators, showing year released
Title	Year	Creator (s)
"Third of May / Ōdaigahara"	2017	Sean Pecknold and Adi Goodrich
