= Helplessness Blues Tour =

2011–12 concert tour by Fleet Foxes

- Tour by Fleet Foxes
- Location: Worldwide
- Associated album: Helplessness Blues
- Start date: 15 April 2011
- End date: 20 January 2012
- Legs: 8
- No. of shows: 113

Fleet Foxes concert chronology
- -; Helplessness Blues Tour (2011); -

The Helplessness Blues Tour was a world tour by Seattle folk band Fleet Foxes in support of their second album Helplessness Blues which was released on May 3, 2011. The tour visited North America, Europe, Oceania and Japan.

== Background ==
The Tour began in the band home town of Seattle, Washington before moving across the United States and Canada. A European leg was then announced which began in Berlin, Germany. This leg included three sold-out shows at London's Hammersmith Apollo. A second North American leg took place July 14 and July 24, 2011, with another European leg taking place from August 11–20. The Band performed at some of Europe's best known Festivals including the Glastonbury Festival and Rock Werchter. The fifth leg of the tour began with two shows at Seattle's Paramount Theatre, followed by a string of shows in the United States. A Third European leg took place in November–December 2011 before moving onto Australia for some festival shows. A short Japanese leg also took place in January 2012. Two New Zealand shows were announced on September 5. Australian headline shows were also announced for January 2012.

== Example set list ==
1. "The Cascades"
2. "Grown Ocean"
3. "Drops in the River"
4. "Battery Kinzie"
5. "Bedouin Dress"
6. "Sim Sala Bim"
7. "Mykonos"
8. "Your Protector"
9. "Tiger Mountain Peasant Song"
10. "White Winter Hymnal"
11. "Ragged Wood"
12. "Lorelai"
13. "Montezuma"
14. "He Doesn't Know Why"
15. "The Shrine/An Argument"
16. "Blue Spotted Tail"
17. "Blue Ridge Mountains"

Encore

1. "Oliver James"
2. "Helplessness Blues"

== Support acts ==
- The Cave Singers (Leg 1, North America—select dates)
- The Bees (Leg 2 & 4, Europe—select dates)
- Owen Pallett (Leg 2, Europe—select dates)
- Alela Diane (Leg 3, North America)
- The Walkmen (Leg 5, North America—select dates)
- Bon Iver (Leg 5, North America—select dates)
- Van Dyke Parks (Leg 5, North America—select dates)
- Vetiver (Leg 6, Europe—select dates)

== Tour dates ==
Date	City	Country	Venue
Leg 1: North America
April 15, 2011	Seattle	United States	Columbia City Theatre
April 29, 2011	Vancouver	Canada	Vogue Theatre
April 30, 2011	Vancouver	Canada	Vogue Theatre
May 1, 2011	Portland	United States	Crystal Ballroom
May 2, 2011	Seattle	United States	Moore Theatre
May 3, 2011	Seattle	United States	Moore Theatre
May 5, 2011	Oakland	United States	Fox Oakland Theatre
May 6, 2011	San Diego	United States	Spreckels Theater
May 7, 2011	Los Angeles	United States	Hollywood Palladium
May 8, 2011	Tucson	United States	Rialto Theatre
May 10, 2011	Austin	United States	Stubb's Bar-B-Q
May 11, 2011	Dallas	United States	Palladium Ballroom
May 13, 2011	Nashville	United States	Ryman Auditorium
May 14, 2011	Atlanta	United States	The Tabernacle
May 15, 2011	Washington, D.C.	United States	DAR Constitution Hall
May 18, 2011	New York City	United States	United Palace
May 19, 2011	New York City	United States	United Palace
May 21, 2011	Upper Darby Township	United States	Tower Theater
Leg 2: Europe
May 25, 2011	Berlin	Germany	C-Halle
May 26, 2011	Dachau	Germany	Rathausplatz
May 28, 2011	Barcelona	Spain	Parc del Fòrum Leisure Site^{[A]}
May 30, 2011	Paris	France	Bataclan
May 31, 2011	London	England	Hammersmith Apollo
June 1, 2011	London	England	Hammersmith Apollo
June 2, 2011	London	England	Hammersmith Apollo
June 23, 2011	Wolverhampton	England	Wolverhampton Civic Hall
June 24, 2011	Pilton	England	Worthy Farm^{[B]}
June 25, 2011	Belfast	Northern Ireland	Cathedral Quarter^{[C]}
June 26, 2011	Cork	Ireland	The Docklands^{[D]}
June 28, 2011	Manchester	England	Apollo
June 29, 2011	Edinburgh	Scotland	Corn Exchange
July 1, 2011	St Blazey	England	Eden Project^{[E]}
July 3, 2011	Werchter	Belgium	Werchter Festival Grounds^{[F]}
July 4, 2011	Paris	France	Salle Pleyel
July 6, 2011	Poznań	Poland	Lake Malta^{[G]}
July 8, 2011	Oeiras	Portugal	Algés Riverside^{[H]}
July 10, 2011	Turku	Finland	Ruissalo Island^{[I]}
Leg 3: North America
July 14, 2011	Toronto	Canada	Massey Hall
July 16, 2011	Chicago	United States	Union Park^{[J]}
July 17, 2011	Minneapolis	United States	State Theatre
July 18, 2011	Kansas City	United States	Uptown Theater
July 19, 2011	St. Louis	United States	The Pageant
July 21, 2011	Denver	United States	Fillmore Auditorium
July 22, 2011	Salt Lake City	United States	Red Butte Garden and Arboretum
July 23, 2011	Boise	United States	Knitting Factory
July 24, 2011	Troutdale	United States	McMenamins Edgefield Manor
Leg 4: Europe
August 11, 2011	Oslo	Norway	Middelalderparken^{[K]}
August 12, 2011	Gothenburg	Sweden	Slottsskogen^{[L]}
August 13, 2011	Rees-Haldern	Germany	Festival Grounds^{[M]}
August 14, 2011	Saint-Malo	France	Festival Grounds^{[N]}
August 16, 2011	Brighton	England	Brighton Dome
August 18, 2011	Hasselt	Belgium	Kiewit^{[O]}
August 19, 2011	Biddinghuizen	Netherlands	Spijk en Bremerberg^{[P]}
August 20, 2011	Brecon Beacons	Wales	Glanusk Park Estate^{[Q]}
Leg 5: North America
September 6, 2011	Seattle	United States	Paramount Theatre
September 7, 2011	Seattle	United States	Paramount Theatre
September 9, 2011	Reno	United States	Grand Sierra Resort
September 10, 2011	Berkeley	United States	Hearst Greek Theatre
September 11, 2011	Big Sur	United States	Henry Miller Library
September 13, 2011	Santa Barbara	United States	Santa Barbara Bowl
September 14, 2011	Los Angeles	United States	Greek Theatre
September 15, 2011	Phoenix	United States	Comerica Theatre
September 17, 2011	Tulsa	United States	Cain's Ballroom
September 18, 2011	Austin	United States	Zilker Park^{[R]}
September 20, 2011	Jacksonville	United States	Florida Theatre
September 21, 2011	Raleigh	United States	Raleigh Amphitheatre
September 23, 2011	Columbia	United States	Merriweather Post Pavilion
September 24, 2011	New York City	United States	Williamsburg Waterfront
September 25, 2011	Holyoake	United States	Mountain Park
September 28, 2011	Cleveland	United States	Masonic Auditorium
September 29, 2011	Ann Arbor	United States	Hill Auditorium
September 30, 2011	Chicago	United States	Chicago Theatre
October 1, 2011	Chicago	United States	Chicago Theatre
October 3, 2011	Birmingham	United States	Alabama Theatre
October 4, 2011	Asheville	United States	Thomas Wolfe Auditorium
October 5, 2011	Louisville	United States	The Louisville Palace
Leg 6: Europe
November 5, 2011	Bergen	Norway	Grieg Hall
November 6, 2011	Oslo	Norway	Sentrum Scene
November 8, 2011	Stockholm	Sweden	Annexet
November 9, 2011	Malmö	Sweden	K.B. Hallen
November 10, 2011	Copenhagen	Denmark	Falconer Theatre
November 11, 2011	Weissenhäuser Strand	Germany	Rolling Stone Weekender
November 13, 2011	Katowice	Poland	Kozrywki Theatre
November 14, 2011	Zagreb	Croatia	Tvornica
November 15, 2011	Vienna	Austria	Museumsquartier
November 17, 2011	Rome	Italy	Atlántico
November 19, 2011	Bologna	Italy	Estragon
November 20, 2011	Milan	Italy	Teatro Smeraldo
November 21, 2011	Zürich	Switzerland	Komplex 457
November 22, 2011	Fribourg	Switzerland	Fri-Son
November 24, 2011	Bilbao	Spain	Santana 27
November 25, 2011	Madrid	Spain	La Riviera
November 26, 2011	Cartagena	Spain	Jazz Festival
November 27, 2011	Barcelona	Spain	L'Auditori
November 29, 2011	Amsterdam	Netherlands	Heineken Music Hall
November 30, 2011	Brussels	Belgium	Forest National
December 1, 2011	Leeds	England	O2 Academy Leeds
December 2, 2011	Minehead	England	Butlin's Minehead
Leg 7: Oceania
December 29, 2011	Lorne	Australia	Festival Grounds^{[S]}
December 30, 2011	Marion Bay	Australia	Festival Grounds^{[S]}
January 2, 2012	Sydney	Australia	Sydney Opera House
January 3, 2012	Sydney	Australia	Sydney Opera House
January 4, 2012	Sydney	Australia	Sydney Opera House
January 6, 2012	Melbourne	Australia	Palais Theatre
January 7, 2012	Busselton	Australia	Sir Stewart Bovell Park^{[T]}
January 8, 2012	Busselton	Australia	Sir Stewart Bovell Park^{[T]}
January 10, 2012	Brisbane	Australia	Tivoli
January 11, 2012	Brisbane	Australia	Tivoli
January 13, 2012	Wellington	New Zealand	Hunter Lodge
January 14, 2012	Auckland	New Zealand	Auckland Town Hall
Leg 8: Asia
January 17, 2012	Osaka	Japan	Big cat
January 18, 2012	Nagoya	Japan	Club Quattro
January 20, 2012	Tokyo	Japan	Studio Coast

Festivals and other miscellaneous performances

- A^This show was part of the Primavera Festival.
- B^This show was part of the Glastonbury Festival.
- C^This show was part of the Coors Light Open House Festival.
- D^This show was part of the Live at the Marquee (festival).
- E^This show was part of the Eden Sessions.
- F^This show was part of the Rock Werchter Festival.
- G^This show was part of the Malta Festival.
- H^This show was part of the Optimus Alive! Festival.
- I^This show was part of the Ruisrock Festival.
- J^This show was part of the Pitchfork Music Festival.
- K^This show is part of the Øyafestivalen.
- L^This show is part of the Way Out West Festival.
- M^This show is part of the Haldern Pop Festival.
- N^This show is part of the La Route du Rock Festival.
- O^This show is part of the Pukkelpop Festival.
- P^This show is part of the Lowlands Festival.
- Q^This show is part of the Green Man Festival.
- R^This show is part of the Austin City Limits Music Festival.
- S^These shows are part of the Falls Festival.
- T^These shows are part of the Southbound Festival.

=== Box office score data ===
Venue	City	No. of Shows	Tickets sold / available	Gross revenue
Stubb's Bar-B-Q	Austin	1	2,200 / 2,200 (100%)	$61,680
DAR Constitution Hall	Washington, D.C.	1	3,500 / 3,500 (100%)	$117,619
Columbiahalle	Berlin	1	3,167 / 3,500 (90%)	$97,826
State Theatre	Minneapolis	1	2,054 / 2,054 (100%)	$60,593
Knitting Factory	Boise	1	994 / 994 (100%)	$27,366
Hearst Greek Theatre	Berkeley	1	6,694 / 7000 (96%)	$264,207
Santa Barbara Bowl	Santa Barbara	1	2,250 / 4,059 (55%)	$68,725
Greek Theatre	Los Angeles	1	4,979 / 5,849 (85%)	$176,395
Williamsburg Waterfront	Brooklyn	1	7,000 / 7,000 (100%)	$276,500
Hill Auditorium	Ann Arbor	1	3,356 / 3,356 (100%)	$114,104
Chicago Theatre	Chicago	2	6,878 / 6,878 (100%)	$240,730
Alabama Theatre	Birmingham	1	1,723 / 2,062 (84%)	$55,958

== Fleet Foxes ==
- Robin Pecknold: lead vocals, guitar
- Skyler Skjelset: lead guitar, mandolin
- Christian Wargo: bass guitar, vocals
- Casey Wescott: Keyboard, mandolin, vocals
- Joshua Tillman: drums, vocals, arrangements
- Morgan Henderson: multi-instrumentalist, arrangements
