= Mykonos (disambiguation) =

Mykonos is a Greek island in the Aegean Sea.

Mykonos may also refer to:

- Mykonos restaurant assassinations of several Iranian Kurdish opposition leaders at a restaurant in Berlin, Germany
- "Mykonos" (song), a song by the band Fleet Foxes
