= Sacramento Department of Utilities =

City utility company

The Sacramento Department of Utilities is a public utility that serves the City of Sacramento. It maintains and provides water to Sacramento residents, manages the sewage and provides storm water drainage services. Initially known as Sacramento City Water Works, the department was founded in 1873. The Department of Utilities is overseen by the Utilities Director and has four main divisions: Water Operations & Maintenance, Wastewater/Drainage Operations & Maintenance, Business & Integrated Planning, and Engineering & Water Resources. Revenue is generated primarily from charging for water, sewage and drainage services and the department's spending budget for the 2019-2020 fiscal year was around 148 million dollars.

== History ==
Sacramento, prior to the development of a water works system, distributed water to its citizens from the Sacramento River. The water was pumped from the river into wooden tanks, which would then be distributed to the population via carts. After an epidemic of cholera in 1850 and a fire that destroyed large parts of Sacramento, work began on a water works system, which was completed in 1854. This system, however, proved to be inadequate and in 1873 the direct pumping system was established.

The Sacramento Department of Utilities, initially known as Sacramento City Water Works, was founded in 1873.

== Organization ==
The Sacramento Department of Utilities is overseen by the Utilities Director and the Officer of the Director. The current Utilities Director is William Busath. There are four divisions that report to the Office of the Director: Water Operations & Maintenance, Wastewater/Drainage Operations & Maintenance, Business & Integrated Planning, and Engineering & Water Resources. Additionally, there are four other divisions that interact with the government and the community: Government Affairs, Public Affairs, Security & Preparedness and Sustainability.

== Responsibilities ==
The Sacramento Department of Utilities responsibilities include three major areas of service: Water, Drainage and Wastewater.

=== Water ===
The Department of Utilities is responsible for providing the citizens of Sacramento with clean water. This includes water production, treatment, storage and distribution through the use of treatment plants, underground pipes, and wells. Sacramento draws water from the Sacramento River and the American River and is treated through two plants: the Fairbairn Water Treatment Plant (which can treat 160 million gallons a day) and the Sacramento River Water Treatment Plant (which can treat 100 million gallons a day).

Sacramento produced 91,862 acre feet of water for use in 2018. Around 70% of the water came from the Sacramento River and the American River while about 29.5% was groundwater and 0.5% was bought from another water district. There are two drinking water treatment plants, including the Fairbairn Water Treatment Plant that is located near the Sacramento State campus and drawing water from the American River. There are also 27 active groundwater wells, 11 storage reservoirs and 1,602 miles of pipe.

=== Drainage ===
The Department of Utilities is responsible for collection and conveyance of storm water through the use of pump stations, ditches, channels and levees. A majority of the storm water will eventually find its way to nearby rivers and channels.

=== Wastewater ===
The Department of Utilities is responsible for the safe collection, conveyance, and treatment of wastewater through the use of pumps, pipes, and storage and treatment facilities. The sewer system is split into two sections: the Combined Sewer System, or CSS, which consists of the older, central areas of Sacramento and the Separated Sewer System for the remaining areas. Waste water from the sewer system flows to the Sacramento Regional Wastewater Treatment Plant. Here it is treated, then disposed through a series pump stations and pipes known as an Interceptor System. As of 2018, the total amount of wastewater facilities include 2 primary treatment plants, 54 pump stations, 1 storage facility, 903 miles of pipe, and 17,708 manholes.

== Finances ==
The Department of Utilities receives revenue from charging for water, drainage and wastewater services as well as from selling water to other water agencies, development impact fees, and government payments. In 2018, the Department of Utilities received 125.62 million dollars from water services revenue, 42.06 million dollars from wastewater services revenue and 40.2 million dollars from drainage services revenue. For all services, a majority of the revenue comes from service charges and fees. The department was also given almost 3.2 million dollars in grants for projects and programs in 2018. The Department of Utilities has four main expenses: Employee Services, Service and Supply cost, the General Fund tax, and Debt services. In 2018, the Department of Utilities spent 94.09 million dollars on water services, 30.2 million dollars on wastewater services and 38.21 million dollars on drainage services.

For the 2019–2020 fiscal year, the City of Sacramento's approved budget was 1.2 billion dollars. The approved budget for the Department of Utilities was 148,736,776 dollars.
