= Sacramento City Hall =

Coordinates: 38.58189°N 121.49355°W

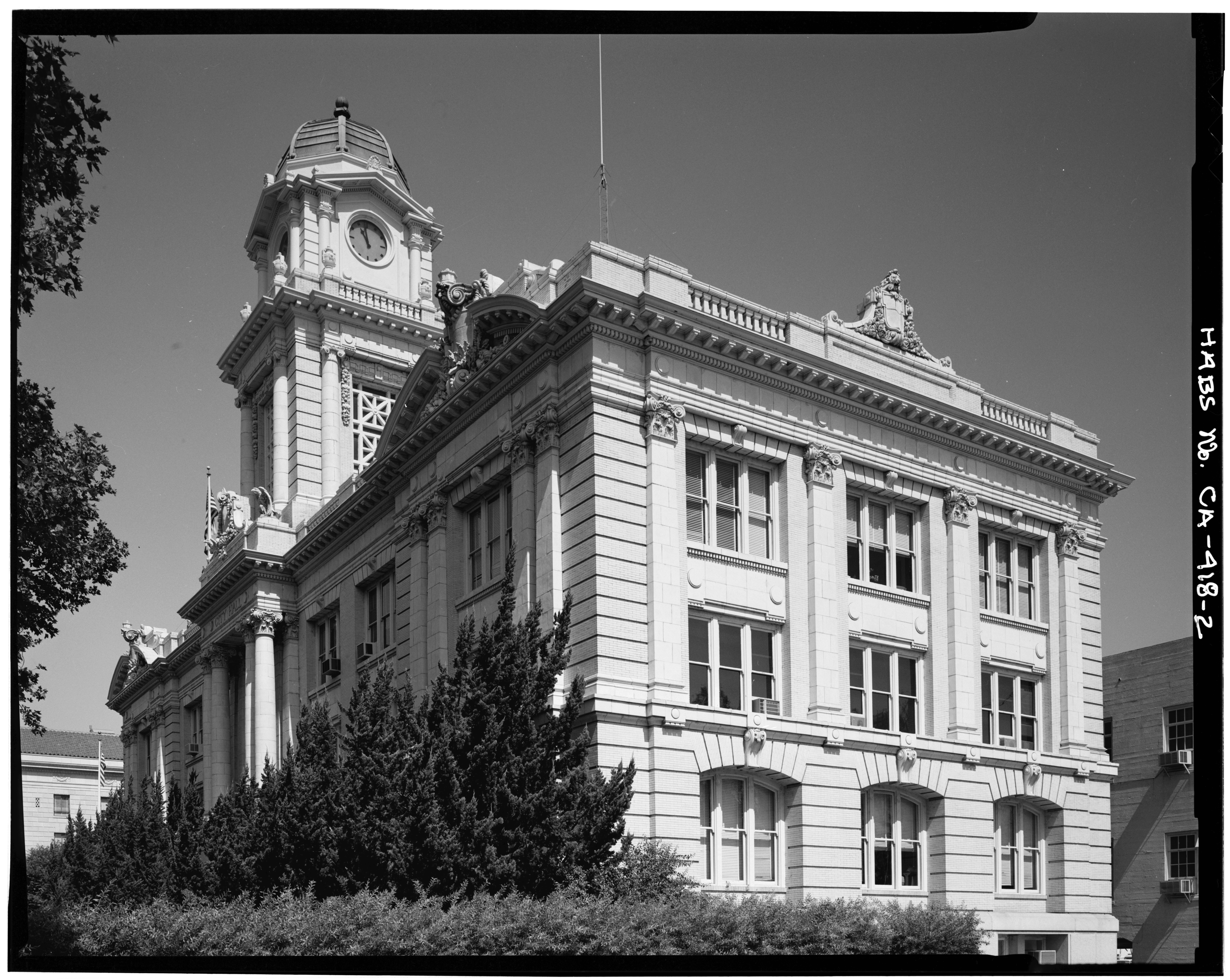
Sacramento City Hall, 1981.

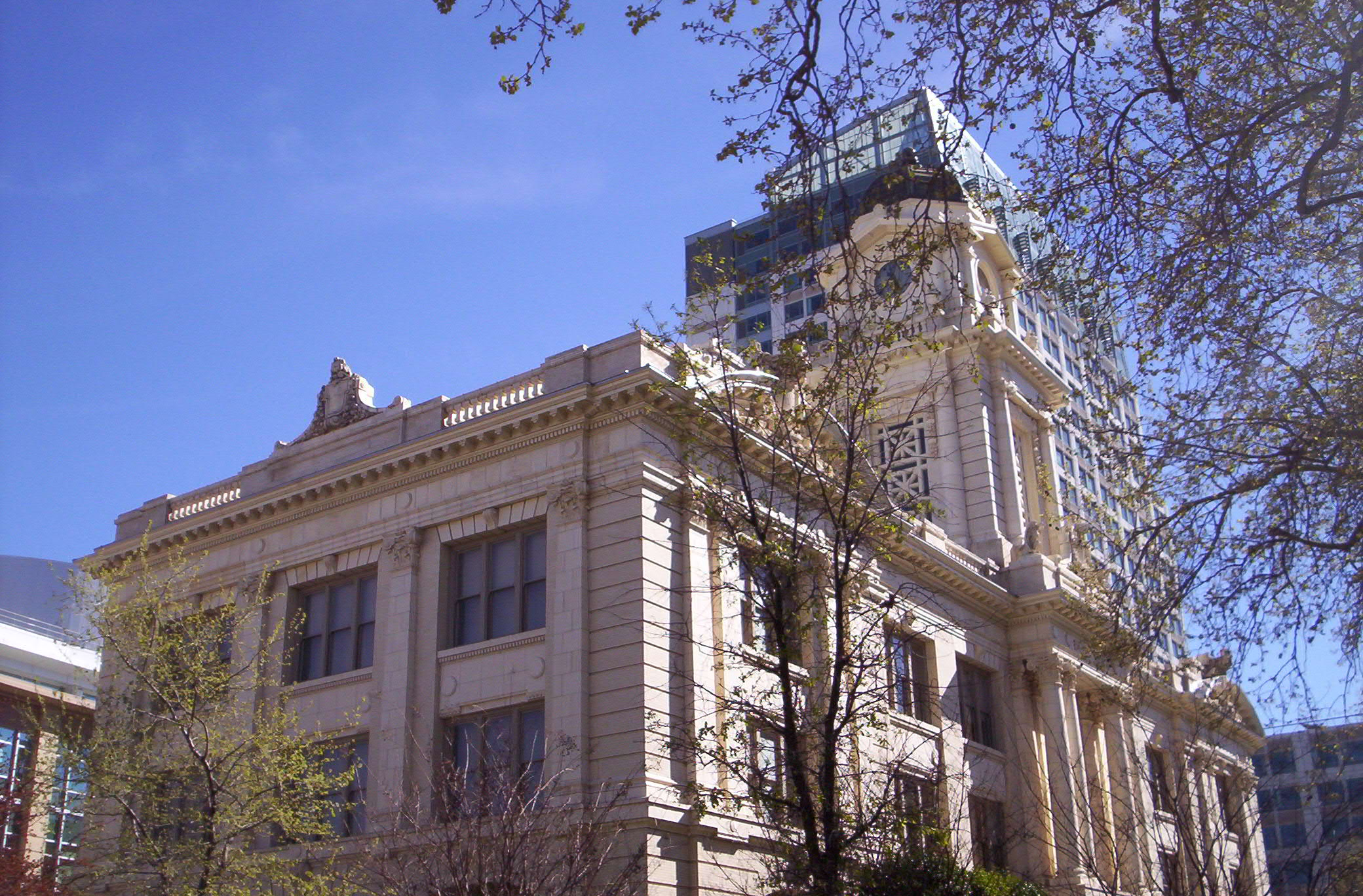
Sacramento City Hall, 2008.

Sacramento City Hall is a five-story, 267,000-square-foot building that combines modern and historic structures in Sacramento, California. The building can house up to 730 staff members. Prominent local architect Rudolph A. Herold designed the building in 1908. Completed in 1909, the building is located at 915 I Street. Sacramento City Hall went through a major $11 million restoration from 2003 to 2005. The restoration was part of an overall $60 million civic center project with city hall as the cornerstone. Another part of the civic center project was the construction of underground parking garage for 170 cars. Sacramento City Hall now houses all of the city's significant municipal functions.

== Municipal services housed at Sacramento City Hall ==
- Mayor's Office
- City Council Chambers
- City attorney's office
- City auditor
- City clerk
- City code
- Employment
- City manager
- City treasurer
- Codes & policies
- Department directors
- Records library

== City departments ==
- Community Development
- Convention & Cultural Services
- Economic Development
- Sacramento Fire Department
- Finance Department
- General Services
- Human Resources
- Information Technology
- Parks and Recreation
- Sacramento Police Department
- Public Works
- Sacramento Department of Utilities
