= Overaa Construction =

American construction company

- Type: Private
- Industry: Construction
- Founded: 1907
- Founder: Carl E. Overaa
- Headquarters: Richmond, California, United States
- Key people: Gerald D. Overaa (CEO); Christopher Manning (President)
- Revenue: $235 million (2011)
- Number of employees: 350 (2012)
- Website: www.overaa.com

Overaa Construction is an American family-owned construction company based in Richmond, California, which provides general contracting and design/build services in Northern California. It is one of the largest contractors in California and since 1993, has been listed among ENR's top 400 contractors in the US.

Overaa Construction has a self-performing concrete capability. The company crews perform about 600,000 man-hours on average each year, three fourths of which are concrete work.

== History ==
The company was established in 1907 by a Norwegian immigrant and carpenter Carl E. Overaa, who committed himself to rebuilding the Bay Area after the San Francisco earthquake of 1906.

Jerry (Gerald) Overaa, Carl Overaa's grandson, joined the firm in 1966. As of 2026, he works in the company as its chairman of the board of directors.

After the Great Recession the company worked on a number of projects supported by funds of the American Reinvestment and Recovery Act, including two projects for the Lawrence Berkeley National Laboratory. In 2010, Overaa Construction logged the highest amount of man-hours among general contractors in Northern California.

In March 2011, Christopher Manning, who worked at the company for 25 years, was appointed president after Peter Kappelhoff retired.

== Notable projects ==
Overaa has completed many notable construction projects throughout California. Among them are:

- UC San Francisco Parking Structure. It features a design reminiscent of DNA fingerprinting. It received the Merit Award in the AIA San Francisco Design Awards competition in 2006.
- Lafayette Library and Learning Center building completed in 2009.
- Richmond City Hall renovation. It was part of the $78-million Richmond Civic Center Revitalization project in which Overaa Construction received primary contract for the City Hall's seismic upgrade, building envelope repair and interior renovation. The revitalization project won the "Best of 2009" awards in Northern California by the California Construction magazine in two categories: "Overall Top Project" and "Best of Government/Public".
- Las Positas College, Center for the Arts completed in 2010.
- Mission Bay Block 27 Parking Structure. It received the Citation Award in the AIA San Francisco Design Awards competition in 2010.
- Advanced Light Source User Support Building at the Lawrence Berkeley National Laboratory (LBNL) completed in 2010. The 31,000-square-foot building became the second one to receive LEED Gold rating at the LBNL. About 10 percent of the building is made from recycled material.
- Hearst Greek Theatre seismic upgrade and expansion completed in May 2012.
- Sacramento River Water Treatment Plant (SRWTP) and E. A. Fairbairn Water Treatment Plant (EAFWTP) rehabilitation, a $113-million project started in 2013.
