= Rudolph A. Herold =

American architect

Rudolph A. Herold

Rudolph A. Herold (1870 – April 24, 1926) was an architect based in Sacramento, California.

== Career ==
"The architect for the building, Rudolph Herold, was a prominent Sacramento region designer who completed an impressive number of works in Northern California prior to his death at age 56. Herold was responsible for the design of the Sacramento City Hall, Forum Building and Capitol National Bank Building, as well as a number of other prominent local landmarks. Herold's years of architectural study in Europe, particularly Vienna, during the early part of the 20th century, appear to be responsible for his bold combinations of past and very new motifs into architectural interpretations uniquely his own [Architect & Engineer]"

"The building's architect, Rudolph Herold, was born in San Francisco in 1870. At the age of 18, he took a job with McDougall & Sons, a building firm that evolved into an architectural firm. After several years with McDougall, Herold set out on his own as an independent architect and taught architecture at the Lincoln Evening School. Soon after, Herold went to Europe for a three year stay to study architecture [Architect & Engineer]."

"After his return, Herold moved to Sacramento in 1901 and he soon gained a reputation for his work on public buildings. Herold was a master of many styles of architecture, but was particularly adept with the use of terra cotta ornamentation. Over the years, Herold produced many memorable public and private structures, such as: Sacramento City Hall, Sacramento County Court House, Sacramento County Jail, Sacramento County Hospital, Tehama County Jail, Capital National Bank, Masonic Temple, Forum Building, Gormley Building, Del Paso Country Club, Mercy Hospital, Weimar Sanitarium in Colfax, Providence Hospital and Nurses Home in Oakland, and the Majestic Theater in Sacramento. Herold also designed many educational institutions, such as: Lincoln School, Marshall School, St. Francis School and Priory, Holy Rosary Academy in Woodland, Auburn High School, and Sutler Jr. High. Residences for prominent Sacramento families included Didion, McClatchy. Diepenbrock, Margen, Keyes, and Senator Bills. In addition, he designed two homes, in his home town of Lincoln, for the Jansen family. [Source: Architect & Engineer. Sacramento Bee.] For his era, Rudolph Herold was recognized as one of the leading architects in Sacramento [Architect & Engineer]."

"Its designer, Rudolph Herold, was an innovative master architect who skillfully commanded and combined a range of stylistic vocabulary and design philosophies to create his own unique and highly aesthetic architectural statement."

"Architect & Engineer: Vol. 4, No. 3, pp. 60, 79, 88; Vol. 38, No. 2, p.85; Vol. 44, No. 2, pp 54-61; Vol. 45, No. 1, p. 49; Vol. 61, No. 1, p. 65; Vol. 61, No. 3, pp. 46, 48-65; Vol. 85, No. 2, p. 85."

Works include:

- Sacramento City Hall (before 1908)
- Sacramento Masonic Temple, 1131 J St., Sacramento, CA, listed on the National Register of Historic Places
- Mater Misericordiac Hospital, Sacramento
- Sacramento County Courthouse (built in 1913, demolished in 1965)

After Rudolph's death his brother continued the firm, renamed P. J. Herold and Company.
