= Sacramento Masonic Temple =

- U.S. National Register of Historic Places
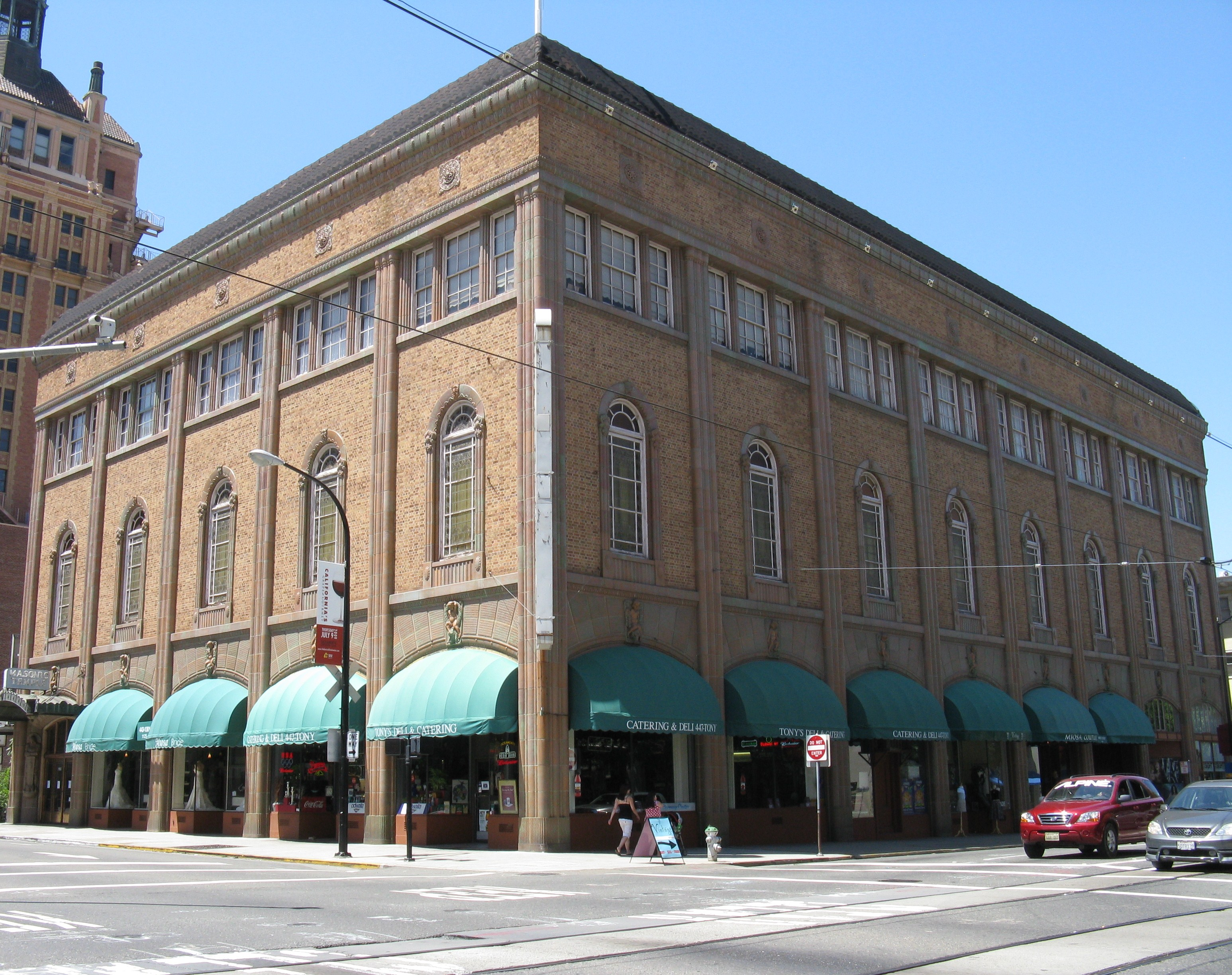

- Location within Sacramento, California Location within California Location within the United States
- Location: 1131 J St., Sacramento, California
- Coordinates: 38°34′47.5″N 121°29′27.4″W
- Area: less than one acre
- Built: 1918
- Architect: Rudolph A. Herold
- Architectural style: Beaux Arts, Renaissance Revival, etc.
- Website: www.sacramentomasonictemple.org
- NRHP reference No.: 01000488
- Added to NRHP: May 17, 2001

The Sacramento Masonic Temple, built between 1913 and 1918, is a five-story building on J Street in downtown Sacramento, California. The building was listed on the National Register of Historic Places in 2001.

Since 1918, the Masonic Temple has hosted numerous events from weddings to family celebrations, meetings and conferences to product launches. It is considered one of the most intact architectural period pieces in downtown Sacramento, California. It has an 8,000 square feet (740 m^{2}) room which can accommodate up to 499 guests for a sit-down meal.

== The architect ==
The building was designed by Rudolph Herold, a Sacramento architect that contributed a number of important works to Sacramento's rapidly growing architectural stock in the early twentieth century, including notable public structures as well as private.

The Masonic Temple building is approximately five stories in height (from ground level,) with a below-grade basement. The rectangular concrete structure is surfaced on the principal south and east elevations with face brick and patterned terra cotta, beneath a hipped roof parapet sheathed with clay mission tile.

The surfaces on the north (alley) and west (above parking lot) are of brick without decorative terra cotta. The principal elevations are divided vertically into bays by shallow terra cotta-sheathed fluted pilasters that extend from the street up to the frieze beneath the projecting cornice.

There are eight bays along 12th Street and five along J Street. The north elevation on the alley is brick, with window openings, those on the top floor extending around the building from the south and east elevations. The west elevation overlooks a parking lot, its brick surface penetrated by windows, and part of its surface decorated with a large painted mural.

The rear of the building lies on the alley between I and J Streets. The west elevation contains a shallow recess or indentation to provide a light well for windows in the west wall when a former building stood adjacent to the property.

The building is divided horizontally into four areas or tiers: the ground floor tier on both 12th and J Streets contains shops and shop bays, with terra cotta spandrels above the arched clerestory and standard shop windows, and angled recessed shop entries. The tall second floor tier contains tall, handsome, arched windows with stained glass insets and tympanums, enframed with detailed terra cotta moldings that emphasize the arches, keystones, and window footings.

== Cherubs ==
Each window is centered above the "cupid" keystone in the spandrels of the arches below. The third tier is defined by a band of windows surrounding the building on three sides. The fluted pilasters end at the upper edge of the wood sash, multi-paned windows. Each group of windows in each bay is divided into three sections, the center section being the widest.

The top tier, (obscuring a high interior ceiling, shallow attic space and the roof,) includes the brick frieze above the windows, terra cotta cornice, and tiled roof parapet. The separation of each of the different tiers is emphasized horizontally by a variety of sizes and shapes of decorative terra cotta trim that include egg and dart motifs, and twisting rope designs.

The main entry of the Temple itself is guarded by two full size terra cotta figures representing medieval Knights Templar, mounted on either side of the segmented arched doorway. A terra cotta inscription on the doorway arch provides the name of the building. A richly decorated arched metal canopy with ornamental lamps on the outer two corners covers the entry, with its two sets of decorative metal double doors. Large clerestory windows above the doors provide light to the interior lobby.

The lobby is surfaced with light-colored terra cotta shaped to resemble stone laid in courses, a grand staircase with a dramatic and voluptuous newel post and balustrade, marble steps and risers, and patterned terra cotta tile floor. Figured shields, symbolic of aspects of the brotherhood of Masonry, decorate the side walls of the lobby. The ceiling contains layers of different decorative moldings and painted stencil work.

The entry lobby contains the original Otis elevator, reputedly the company's first in Sacramento. It is still operational. Two door panels, with glass above and solid metal below, slide behind the same styled outer door to access the cab. Its cab still displays the original open cage frame and meshwork. The outer frame of the elevator contains a cast bronze header of the same design on each floor. The elevator is framed with cast bronze fittings and displays various decorative elements also cast in bronze.

== Lodge rooms ==
The second floor contains four large meeting rooms with tall ceilings that open off the north–south hallway, and extend all the way from the hall to the east wall of the building. The temple meeting rooms, traditionally referred to as "lodge rooms" by the Freemasons, are outstanding in scale and ornament. The rooms are similar in layout and size, with anterooms and lockers nearest the hallway, and the large rooms beyond through large solid oak doors with inset wood trim of different colors. The rooms have decorative beamed and coffered ceilings, two arched windows on the east, and faux arched windows to appear similar, on north and south. The large expansive interior spaces themselves are decorated with beamed ceilings and a rich variety of stencil patterns, moldings and trim. The ceiling beams and coffers are very finely executed, one room containing richly gilded moldings and another finely stenciled beams, and others a combination. The rooms each contain a balcony supported by terra cotta bracketing. Each room is decorated somewhat differently, but have in common a large tall interior space with raised seating and fine wood wall paneling all around the sides. Special ceremonial chairs are located in the middle of each of the four sides, with the principal focus on the center of the east and west sides of the rooms.

All wood paneling surrounding the lower half of the room and including entry doors and locker cabinets, is expertly crafted. Decorative arched stained glass windows provide a filtered exterior light to the meeting rooms from the eastern elevation. There are four small free-standing ceremonial pillars and a central stand in the middle of the rooms. Original hanging light fixtures, and wall fixtures with the symbolic ''sun" design in cast metal light the "stations" within the rooms.

The third floor contains a large ballroom, a dining area, a ladies lounge area, a club room, and an office with a library. The office and club room are positioned along J Street on the uppermost floor.

A tall fireplace surfaced with terra cotta tile lies on the west wall of the club room. The room opens into another large adjacent room containing three large oak and slate pool tables with period light fixtures suspended above them. The wood paneled room contains special cupboards behind matched paneling, with players' personal pool cues, chalk etc. These recreational rooms all have hardwood floors.

A large, adjacent, light and airy room on the southeast corner of the building is currently being used as an office and contains tall windows on both elevations that flood the room with light.

== Ballroom and auditorium ==
A large ballroom with many tall windows, a large wood floor, and a balcony that, with an auditorium, seats 1200, is located on the third floor. Due to modern fire code restrictions, however, the maximum occupancy of the ballroom has been set to no more than 499 people.

The ballroom space is enormous and elegantly appointed. Original light fixtures with an Art Nouveau touch are affixed to auditorium walls that contain terra cotta designs with Moderne style imagery. A large arched opening leads to an area on the back northeast corner, surrounded by windows that can seat many for special programs, dinners, etc., with a kitchen adjacent for the preparation of food and meals. A reception area and restrooms lie beneath the balcony area, accessible from the auditorium floor.

An upper hallway balcony provides a downward view of the entire space of the two rooms, and is as elegantly finished in wood detailing, light fixtures and finishes as is the remainder of the building. Each floor's elevator/stair lobby is handsomely appointed with bronze trim, terra cotta flooring, marble steps, and decorative cast-metal balustrades and posts. Light fixtures throughout the building are original and express various stylistic interpretations of the era. Restrooms have largely retained original integrity, with marble wainscotings and stall panels, and most of the original hardware.

The topmost floor along the west wall contains mechanical equipment and a string of small rooms or "apartments" (that are currently vacant) overlooking the parking lot.

The basement of the building contains a simply finished utilitarian storage room partly beneath the sidewalk, and the original boiler room that contains two large original cast-metal boilers still in operation.

== Modifications ==
The building is essentially unaltered. Exterior modifications are primarily limited to minor modifications of ground floor commercial space, and the addition of a sign on the southeast corner of the building that appeared circa 1970. The shop entry on the north near the alley has been altered.

The facade has been recessed and new windows added to accommodate an architect's office. The interior is essentially original with the following exceptions. The interior of the southernmost Temple room has been repainted from the original. The northwest corner of the ground floor lobby contains a small wood frame entry office/service enclosure that has been built within the original terra cotta walls and decor, and is removable. Acoustical panels have been attached to the walls of the auditorium above the balcony to control acoustics in the large room. The basement storage room has been refinished on the interior and doesn't reflect the age and design of the rest of the building.

Historic photographs indicate that awnings of one sort or another appear to have been mounted on the building for most of its life. The current bow-frame awnings were installed circa 1980. A mural has been painted on the west wall that was exposed when an adjacent building was removed. The mural was added by the Downtown Association in about 1997 to commemorate the upcoming California state sesquicentennial.

== See also ==
- History of Sacramento, California
- California Historical Landmarks in Sacramento County, California
- National Register of Historic Places listings in Sacramento County, California
