= The Fleet Foxes =

EP by Fleet Foxes
- Released: 2006
- Recorded: 2006
- Genres: Indie rock; indie pop
- Length: 22:42
- Label: Self-released
- Producer: Phil Ek

Fleet Foxes chronology
The Fleet Foxes (2006)	Sun Giant (2008)

The Fleet Foxes is the debut EP by American band Fleet Foxes, self-released in 2006. Sold by the band at local shows in Seattle, only 50 CD copies were made. It was released in the fall of 2006 around the Seattle area, and its success led to the eventual signing to Sub Pop records. The album was produced and recorded by veteran Seattle producer Phil Ek. It was remastered and reissued in 2018 as part of the First Collection 2006–2009 boxed set.

The cover was inspired by Alfred Hitchcock's 1959 film North by Northwest.

== Track listing ==
All tracks are written by Robin Pecknold.

No.	Title	Length
1.	"She Got Dressed"	3:29
2.	"In the Hot Hot Rays"	3:04
3.	"Anyone Who's Anyone"	3:50
4.	"Textbook Love"	3:25
5.	"So Long to the Headstrong"	4:16
6.	"Icicle Tusk"	4:38
Total length:		22:42
