= Sun Giant =

EP by Fleet Foxes
- Released: April 8, 2008
- Recorded: January 2008
- Studio: Bear Creek, Woodinville, Washington; Stuart Hollerman's Avasti Studio; Fleet Foxes' house
- Genre: Indie folk
- Length: 18:50
- Label: Bella Union; Sub Pop
- Producer: Phil Ek

Fleet Foxes chronology
The Fleet Foxes (2006)	Sun Giant (2008)	Fleet Foxes (2008)

Singles from Sun Giant
- 1. "Mykonos" Released: January 27, 2009

Sun Giant is the second EP by American band Fleet Foxes, released on April 8, 2008, by Sub Pop and Bella Union. While the EP was released prior to their debut album, Fleet Foxes, Sun Giant was recorded after the LP. Sun Giant was originally intended to be a tour-only release, but demand from fans led to its official release. Fleet Foxes had stated that Sun Giant was pressed so that they had something to sell on tour and clarified that the music did not indicate their ambitions. Despite this, the EP met with widespread critical acclaim; it was named the best album of 2008 by Pitchfork along with their debut LP.

== Background and release ==
Sun Giant was mostly recorded in January 2008 at Bear Creek, Woodinville, Washington. Additional recording was made at the band's house and Stuart Hollerman's Avasti Studio, the latter was also the place where the EP was mixed.

== Reception ==
Professional ratings
Review scores
Source	Rating
AllMusic	4/5 stars
Drowned in Sound	8/10
Gigwise	9/10 stars
The Independent	5/5 stars
The Line of Best Fit	90%
MusicOMH	4.5/5 stars
The Observer	4/5 stars
Pitchfork	8.7/10
Robert Christgau	(dud)
Rolling Stone	3/4 stars

Sun Giant received widespread acclaim from music critics. Billboard said that the EP featured "harmony-rich songs more in keeping with Crosby, Stills & Nash, a welcome turn away from the agitated dance-rock still so prominent in the indie world." Rolling Stone gave the EP three-out-of-four stars, and said that "with ramshackle rising-and-falling guitars, CSNY-style harmonies and the occasional mandolin plink, this five-track EP will make you pine for summer in the country," although the magazine said their songwriting was a bit thin. Sun Giant peaked at number 170 in the US Billboard 200 chart.

== Track listing ==
All tracks are written by Robin Pecknold

No.	Title	Length
1.	"Sun Giant"	2:14
2.	"Drops in the River"	4:13
3.	"English House"	4:41
4.	"Mykonos"	4:35
5.	"Innocent Son"	3:07
Total length:		18:50

== Personnel ==
Credits adapted from the liner notes of Sun Giant, which also state that: "We all played many an instrument. An itemized and individualized list would be egotistical and tiresome".

- Robin Pecknold – [lead] vocals, various instruments [uncredited: guitar]
- Skyler Skjelset – various instruments [uncredited: lead guitar, mandolin, vocals]
- Casey Wescott – various instruments [uncredited: piano, keyboards, vocals]
- Christian Wargo – various instruments [uncredited: bass, guitar, vocals]
- Nicholas Peterson – various instruments [uncredited: drums, percussion, vocals]
- Phil Ek – producer, engineer, mixing
- Ed Brooks – mastering

== Charts ==
Chart performance for Sun Giant
Chart (2009)	Peak position
UK Budget Albums (OCC)	12
US Billboard 200	170
