= E. A. Fairbairn Water Treatment Plant =

Water treatment plant

Coordinates: 38.55675°N 121.41678°W

E.A Fairbairn Water Treatment Plant is a water treatment plant located next to the California State University, Sacramento campus. This water treatment plant, along with Sacramento River Water Treatment Plant on Sacramento River, provide approximately eighty five percent of Sacramento's drinking water. This treatment plant was recently renovated and completed in February 2019.

== Location ==
The EA Faibairn Water Treatment Plant is located near to Sacramento State University and is adjacent to the American River where the plant gets most of its water to begin the treatment process. With the facility being expanded; the older water intensive terrain was removed and replaced with plants that are characterized for being water conserving. Surrounding the plant are large Sycamores that lead to a dry creek infiltration area that captures runoff from storm events, that is added to the supply of water for treatment.

== History ==
The City of Sacramento has two water intake structures: the Sacramento River Water Treatment on Sacramento River and the E.A Fairbairn Water Treatment Plant on the American River. As previously mentioned, both of these water intakes provide more than half of Sacramento drinking water making the two water structures valuable to Sacramento. The E.A. Fairbairn Water Treatment plant was originally built in 1964. The water treatment plant was planned to being expanded further in 2005. The water structure was expanded because several issues had arisen with the original structure.

== Operation ==
The water treatment plant has a maximum diversion capacity of 310 cubic feet per second or 200 million gallons/day, but is constrained by the current technology that will only allow it to pull around 155 cubic feet per second. The E.A. Fairbairn Water Treatment Plant has become part of an agreement back in 2015 to meet city demands of growing population by the year 2030. However, there are discrepancies based on the Hodge Flow Criteria that determine how much the treatment plant can take. The Hodge Flow Criteria describes the minimum in-stream flows needed for consideration to allow diversion for water uptake depending if the flow is greater than or less than the measured index. When Flow is above the Hodge Flow Criteria, water can be sold to residencies and private water consumers at whole sale prices. When stream flow is below Hodge Flow Criteria, water can be provided on wholesale when the rate of pumpback is equal to or exceed delivery rates. Once again, this is based on the 2015 plan for urban water development that can change at any time in the near future.

The EA Fairbairn Water Treatment plant is designed to treat up to 200 million gallons per day utilizing settling, coagulation with aluminum sulfate, chlorine disinfection (2 times), fluoridation, and pH adjustment. Sludge Dewatering occurs at the site where alum (aluminum sulfate) sludge from sedimentation basin, and spent lime from CT basin and reservoirs is then pumped to sludge drying lagoons. Filter wash water lagoons allow for settling and evaporation. The supernatant of this process is historically discharged to the headworks or sanitary sewer. The EA Fairbairn WTP has three sludge drying lagoons and two filer wash lagoons that are all concrete lines, sludge is removed from these lagoons when they are no longer free draining, and further dried to a solids content of 20-50% before disposal. The dried sludge is then disposed at an offside solid waste landfill.

EA Fairbairn WTP submitted to the Region 5 Water Quality Control Board a conceptual sludge management plan to help save money. The plan consisted of efforts to prevent or minimize sludge exposure to stormwater runoff and a plan to provide sludge only to public agencies and business with an appropriate licenses and permits.

== Structural issues and further improvement ==
Many of the early 1960s concrete hydraulic structures have developed several, concerning water leaks. The Sacramento Utilities of Sacramento did a condition assessment study that was completed in 2009 which identified that the infrastructure at the treatment plant needed either placement or rehabilitation. These leaks caused concerns for the existing concrete structures and equipment. The structures and out-dated equipment are concerning but there is also concern regarding personnel safety. Many construction companies are coming in and will be involved in several parts of the construction, this construction group is one of many companies that are being brought in by the City of Sacramento to work on the treatment plant.

=== Overaa Construction ===
Overaa Construction is a mid-sized company of regional engineers, builders, and craftsmen that work on multiple projects that range from infrastructure development and upgrading antiquated projects to modern standards. Overaa Construction is a primary contractor to the rehabilitation projects of both the Sacramento River Water Treatment Plant (SRWTP), and the E.A. Fairbairn Water Treatment Plant (EAFWTP). The E.A. Fairbairn Water Treatment Plant would involve the complete re-transformation of the current water infrastructure system that was built back in the 1920s. Since the EAFWTP is limited to the amount of water it can draw from the American River year round; the upgrades will be crucial to the future of the treatment plant, and the efficiency of its operations. This will increase the filtering capacity and reliability of the current pumps within the plant. As said by Jeff Naff, the vice president of water treatment projects "These improvements will provide the city with the most footprint-effective solution for processing water".

=== Blocka Construction ===
Blocka Construction Incorporated provided construction with the electrical and instrumentation system that were necessary for the plant to increase its original 1964 capacity of 80 MGD to 160 MGD. BCI’s construction improvements included lighting systems, fiber optics, fire alarms, gate controllers, data systems, telephone systems, and a North and South Power Center.

Part of the construction process included new SMUD electrical services and an emergency generator backup power. The rehabilitation work on EA Fairbairn was expected to create 455 total jobs (262 direct, 193 indirect and induced), and create 70.2 million dollars in total economic output. Some of the environmental considerations for the project included the adoption of a Water Treatment Plants Rehabilitation Mitigated Negative Declaration and Mitigation Reporting Program (Resolution No. 2012-067) on March 20, 2012 by the City Council. An addendum to the adopted Mitigated Negative Declaration was prepared in accordance with CEQA Guidelines Section 15164, adopted on April 9, 2013 (Resolution No. 2013-0112).

=== Challenges ===
Overaa Construction is working with a team of qualified local and national engineers, consultants and contractors to make sure they are dealing with challenges that arise while working on the facilities. While the improvements are underway, the treatment plant will remain fully operational. Water will still be delivered to citizens around the Sacramento region. Challenges during the improvements include the installation of a new filter complex. This is where the water is filtered out to meet potable standards before further treatment. Another challenge is timing, the structure is estimated to require about 60,000 work hours to complete. The E.A. Fairbairn Water Treatment facility can be closed for two months out of the year during periods of lower demand. This will shift treatment capacity to the other treatment plant within Sacramento to provide potable water. During this time treatment capacity and shits will also be allocated differently to accommodate the retrofitting process.

=== Improvements ===
Improvements to the E.A. Fairbairn Water Treatment Plant are few but deemed necessary for continual operations towards future water treatment applications. Installation of five centrifuges that are manufactured by German manufacturers Andritz would be used to turn muddy water into sludge. A new waste wash-water facility will be built on the premises; these would be built on the already existing water collection basins. Additionally, a sludge-collection system and yard piping would be installed. Two more thickeners, and an additional pumping station were planned to be built on the western area of the plant which is still undeveloped. The new addition of the new pumping station will allow for treatment of 100 million more gallons per day, and still be operable within terms to the maximum of 310 cubic feet per second. The new thickeners will extend about 9 ft below the surface, and the new pumping station will be about 11 ft below the surface. Lastly a new dewatering and disposal system is planned to be built on the eastern side of the sludge pond toward the southern area of the plant.

== Ecology ==
The Sacramento River and the E.A. Fairbairn Water Treatment plant are both situated on a level floodplain south of the American River. The Sacramento Valley was described by the prevalence of wetlands, and freshwater marshes that covered an approximate range of 500,000 acres of land. Dominant terrestrial animal species included black-tailed deer, tule elk, and pronghorn. Marsh, and grasslands within riparian complexes were habitats to waterfowl such as ducks, herons, and cranes. The E.A. Fairbairn Water Treatment Plant lies near a significant bend on the American River. Flooding had becoming increasingly common near the nineteenth-century due to increased mining operations that lead to rapid channel soil deposition. Deposition was largely attributed to hydrologic mining processes that would include fragments from parent rock material from the up stream of the American River. Soils of the Americanos-Urban land complex are mapped at the surface; in the southwest part of the Fairbairn WTP area, and the Rossmoor-Urban land complex are mapped to the north and east. Both soils are associated with alluvial deposits seen in the area. The two soils are quite different in their soil development, the Americanos soils are well-developed, while the Rossmoor soils have no subsurface horizons evident. Studies based on radiocarbon evidence have shown that the Americanos soils in the southwest area are estimated to be between 25,000 and 11,500 years old.
