= Sacramento Regional Wastewater Treatment Plant =

Wastewater treatment plant in Elk Grove, California

- Map showing the location of the SRWTP near Interstate 5 and the Sacramento River
- Location within California
- Location: Elk Grove, California
- Coordinates: 38°27′N 121°28′W
- Type: Wastewater Treatment Plant
- Settlements: Elk Grove, California

The Sacramento Regional Wastewater Treatment Plant (SRWTP) is a wastewater treatment plant in Elk Grove, California, United States. It was built along the Interstate 5 during the 1970s and became fully operational in 1982. The plant was built to centralize wastewater treatment, instead of sending it to the 22 treatment plants that used to exist in the Sacramento Area. The SRWTP employs approximately 350 people, treats approximately 127 million gallons of effluent daily for over 1.4 million people in Elk Grove, Sacramento, Citrus Heights, Folsom, and Rancho Cordova. It was later renamed Regional Sanitation as it continues upgrades to meet new state standards.

== Process ==
The process that SRWTP uses to treat its wastewater takes many steps and requires aid from other agencies. The Sacramento Area Sewer District (SASD) uses its web of underground pipes to send influent from homes and businesses lateral lines to the main sewer line where it will then flow to various trunk lines. These trunk lines flow the influent directly to SRWTP and it will only take approximately 8 hours to process and treat the incoming waste. The first process of primary sedimentation settles material to the bottom, where after removal of most of the waste, Oxygen is added to allow microscopic organisms to break down and digest wastewater particles. After these steps, secondary clarifiers will remove the microscopic organisms that settle on the bottom of the tanks, and then chlorine is added to the water to assure harmful contaminants are removed. The effluent will finally leave the plant and travel two miles to be discharged into the Sacramento River, near Garcia Bend, and to neutralize the chlorine, SRWTP adds sulfur dioxide before the wastewater enters the river and comes in contact with aquatic life.

== EchoWater project ==
The Central Valley Regional Water Control Board is requiring the project to meet discharge requirements of all treatment plants in the state by 2023, hence the EchoWater Project. According to Industry Tap the project name comes from the idea that "just like sound waves echo back to their original source," so too will SRWTP's water entering the Sacramento River. The EchoWater Project construction started on May 28, 2015, and although required completion date is by 2023 SRWTP is hoping to achieve this before then and is on track with a 2021 finish. Upon the completion of the project, discharged ammonia levels should be reduced approximately 95%, therefore increasing the water quality, the ability to recycle water, and survival rates of the nearly extinct Delta Smelt. Ammonia, nitrates, and other pathogens will be removed through the addition of hypochlorite, sodium bisulphite, and filtering and disinfection layers that will improve the discharged water to a tertiary status that can then be used for landscaping, agriculture, and power plants. Biological Nutrient Removal (BNR) and a Return Activated Sludge systems are other new additions that will also enhance water quality and have a price tag of approximately $500 M.

The EchoWater Projects consists of 12 projects that are primarily funded by California's Clean Water State Revolving Fund that contributed $1.6 B and the State Water Resources Control Board. Monetary aide from these two entities will save Sacramento area customers from high interest costs to their monthly bill statements. When the project first began in 2010, monthly bills were projected to increase to at least $60 per month, now that number has drastically shrunk to only $39 per month in 2021. EchoWater is the largest project in the history of Sacramento, even surpassing the Sacramento International Airport and new Golden 1 Center Arena in cost.

== Biosolids management program ==
SRWTP is one of the state's main contributors of biosolids, also known as treated effluent, and processes a staggering 26,000 dry tons every year. This recycled waste goes into everyday products and is used for soil enhancement. Wastewater is high in N, K, P, and other nutrients which makes it a successful fertilizer, and it also aides in moisture retention and reduces erosion. According to CalRecycle, there are three classifications of biosolid: Class A, Class B, and exceptional quality (EQ). Class A biosolids are pathogen free when added to the soil whereas Class B biosolids may contain minimal amounts of pathogens that will die when in they come into contact with the soil. Effluent has been used for this purpose for much of America's history (night soil). SRWTP provides community education and public outreach to share how the use of biosolids is a great practice in sustainability and reduces human footprint.

== The Bufferlands ==
SRWTP bought the ‘Bufferlands’ in 1970 which entails 2,150 acres surrounding the plant to minimize odors and act as a buffer zone. This area contains both uplands and wetlands and supports native birds, mammals, fish, reptiles, amphibians, as well as some of California's endangered species, and in 2017 a rare albino deer was even spotted at the site. Cattle grazing is also used as a control method for vegetation which allows creatures such as burrowing owls and other native flora and fauna to thrive. Since its creation the Bufferlands riparian forests have doubled which provides a sanctuary for coyotes, hawks, snakes, and other species in a rapidly expanded city. SRWTP provides many opportunities for volunteer and community involvement where nature lovers may assist on current and future restoration projects in the Bufferlands. One such day is the national Migratory Bird Day where they host an event called 'A Walk on the Wild Side' and activities include hiking, live animal presentations, tours, exhibits, and music from the Side-Wheeler String Band. During this event people can also use binoculars to view rare great blue heron, great egret, and double crested cormorant rookeries. According to the scientific article "Habitat Restoration and Bird Responses at the Sacramento Regional County Sanitation District Bufferlands," in 1990 approximately 5 or 6 great blue heron and great egret nests were found on site, but since 2002 these two species have grown to over 100 nests each year. Another species of bird found at the Bufferlands, but does not reside there, is the canvasback duck that once disappeared but now migrates to this region once again.

== Studies ==
A 2017 study from Kraus et al. concluded that phytoplankton declines were not due to Regional San and was from another source (i.e. non-native clams, climate change). A 2014 study from Hasenbein et al. concluded that ammonia from SRWTP was not the only contaminant affecting the spawning of Delta smelt. SRWTP is also currently aiding 4 large USGS studies on the Sacramento River to gather information and learn the effect the plant and its discharge has on the river and riparian habitats.
