= Fleet Foxes (album) =

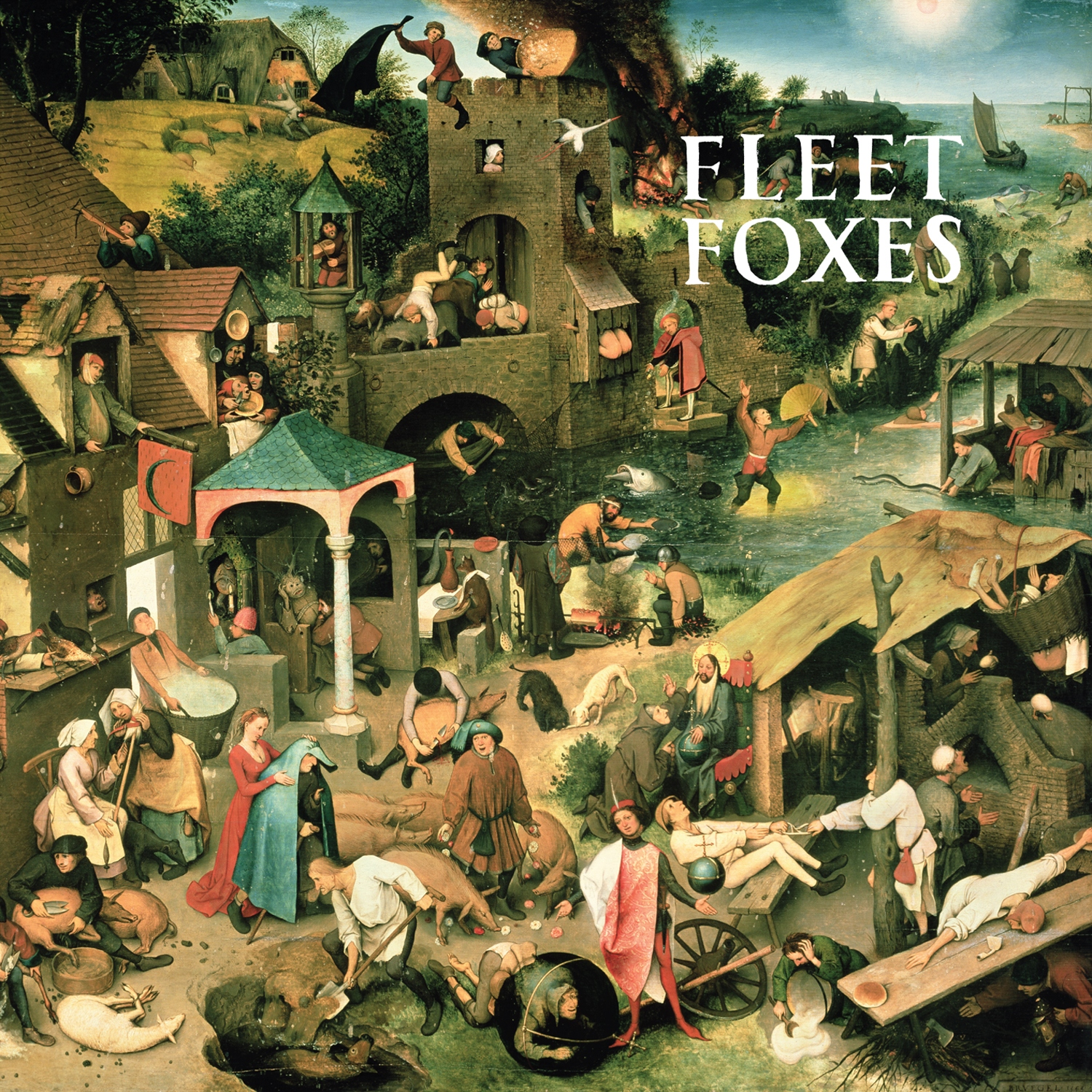

Studio album by Fleet Foxes
- Released: June 3, 2008
- Recorded: 2007
- Studios: Avast! Recording, Seattle; London Bridge, Seattle
- Genres: Indie folk; chamber pop; folk rock; folk-pop; indie rock
- Length: 39:20
- Labels: Sub Pop; Bella Union
- Producer: Phil Ek

Fleet Foxes chronology
Sun Giant (2008)	Fleet Foxes (2008)	Helplessness Blues (2011)

Singles from Fleet Foxes
- 1. "White Winter Hymnal" Released: July 21, 2008; 2. "He Doesn't Know Why" Released: 2008; 3. "Your Protector" Released: 2009

Fleet Foxes is the debut studio album by American band Fleet Foxes, released on June 3, 2008, by Sub Pop and Bella Union. The album garnered wide praise from critics, many of whom named it one of the best albums of the 2000s and one of the greatest debut albums of all time.

== Background ==
Fleet Foxes was formed in Seattle, Washington in 2006 by singer-songwriters Robin Pecknold and Skyler Skjelset. Pecknold grew up in nearby Kirkland, an affluent suburb. His parents gave him an acoustic guitar in middle school. He met Skjelset in high school, bonded over music and similar Norwegian roots. In his tenth grade year, Pecknold dropped out, completing his degree at a community college and immersing himself in music. He moved into the city and secured work at a restaurant, where he joined the local outfit Dolour and befriended other accomplished musicians. Further, Pecknold gained connections through a job at a burrito restaurant, where he discovered more contemporary indie rock.

The pair first settled on the name the Pineapples, but the name was taken by a local punk act. Instead, Pecknold thought of the name Fleet Foxes, which he felt brought to mind fox hunting. The band was rounded out with Christian Wargo (bass, guitar, vocals) and Casey Wescott (keyboards, mandolin, vocals), both members of the electronic outfit Crystal Skulls, and Nicholas Peterson (drums, vocals), formerly of Pedro the Lion. The band booked consistent local gigs and began receiving favorable write-ups in the press.

== Recording ==
The band began recording the album in 2007, in Pecknold's parents' basement and Wescott's home. The album was produced by veteran engineer Phil Ek, best-known for his work with other Pacific Northwest luminaries, such as Built to Spill. Ek had first met Pecknold four years prior. Ek had earlier helped Fleet Foxes record their first demo and used his influence to assist in shopping it to record labels. The resulting album was recorded with Ek over the course of a year. As labels had yet to get involved with the band at this point, the recording was funded by the group themselves.

For the album, the group aimed to rework their existing sound into something more simple, emphasizing harmonies and unconventional song structures. Pecknold described the sessions as constant and exhausting, with the album going through various phases and permutations before they settled on its final state. The album was completed at one point, but was entirely revised and re-recorded. Pecknold noted that nothing could match the idea of the album he envisioned; he continued updating its song sequence and writing new pieces up until it was set to be mixed. Band members would record their parts between shifts at their jobs, and they placed their guitar amplifiers in Native American tipis for aesthetics. Pecknold also suffered from sickness during the recording, which impacted his vocal takes. The album was completed in November 2007, with Pecknold again applying new vocal takes the night before its last mixing session.

== Themes ==
With [the album], we decided to put an emphasis on harmony, simple three- and four-part block harmony. The songs would be simple as well, songs about our friends and family, history, nature, and the things around us in the Pacific Northwest. Instead of complicated vocal melodies, we would try and use guitars and mandolins and banjos and other little guys to fill the melodic spaces in the music. We'd try and avoid conventional song structures, sometimes putting two songs together as one, or avoiding choruses and verses in favor of long vocal rounds and alternating instrumental sections.

— Robin Pecknold

The album fuses folk music, gospel, psychedelic pop, and Sacred Harp styles. Rolling Stone columnist Austin Scaggs described the album's music as dense, singling out its usage of progressive countermelodies. The album's harmonious arrangements were interpreted as lush and textured. Though the music is audibly informed by gospel traditions, Pecknold was not brought up religious. Instead, he felt the devotional aspect proved more compelling from a songwriting standpoint. Its mood evokes bucolic images, yearning for easier times; Pecknold called it "uninformed nostalgia".

The album's pastoral music is primarily acoustic in nature, and its lyrics autobiographical and philosophic—much of the topics related to Pecknold's friends and family. "Blue Ridge Mountains" was originally named after Pecknold's grandfather, Bob Valaas. To write the album, Pecknold traveled to a rural log cabin built by his grandfather in the small community of Plain, Washington. He had just returned home after a long camping trip with his brother and sister, and the sights of nature factored into his lyricism. He was open to the suggestions of his bandmates, and eager to develop songs until the unit as a whole considered it complete. Pecknold, who croons in a doleful tone throughout the work, had an aim to emphasize the vocal arrangements in the way that strings enrich classical music. He strayed from writing love songs, and struggled with anxiety and loneliness in writing the album. "White Winter Hymnal" was written about friends who abandoned Pecknold in high school. Pecknold was particularly inspired by sixties icons Bob Dylan and Brian Wilson, with more contemporary influence drawn from Joanna Newsom and Elliott Smith. In addition, Pecknold listed other mid-20th century acts like the Zombies, Steeleye Span, and Crosby, Stills, Nash & Young as influences.

== Cover art ==
The album's cover is a painting of a peasant landscape, illustrated by sixteenth-century artist Pieter Bruegel the Elder. The painting, Netherlandish Proverbs, was completed in 1559. Vocalist/guitarist Robin Pecknold notes that:

When you first see that painting it's very bucolic, but when you look closer there's all this really strange stuff going on, like dudes defecating coins into the river and people on fire, people carving a live sheep, this weird dude who looks like a tree root sitting around with a dog. There's all this really weird stuff going on. I liked that the first impression is that it's just pretty, but then you realize that the scene is this weird chaos. I like that you can't really take it for what it is, that your first impression of it is wrong.

Pecknold explained to Mojo how the painting ended up on the front cover:

We were trying to figure out what we wanted to do, and my brother had been working out some stuff, when I saw that Bruegel painting in a book my girlfriend had. I liked that it had a really intriguing meaning, like there's a story to each little scene. Which I just felt fitting for that record- dense but unified, not a collage or anything. And I liked its Where's Waldo? quality, that it was something you could look at for a long time on a vinyl sleeve and find new little things. It was very easy to get the museum in Berlin that has it to say yes. They were super excited a band wanted to use it and put it in their newsletter. When you open it up on the inside there's a paisley pattern traced from the back of a book that Skye (Skjelset, lead guitar)'s mum got me. We wanted two very different feelings.

The cover claimed the Best Art Vinyl Award 2008, an annual award, organized by Artvinyl.com, a company that manufactures display frames for record albums.

== Commercial performance ==
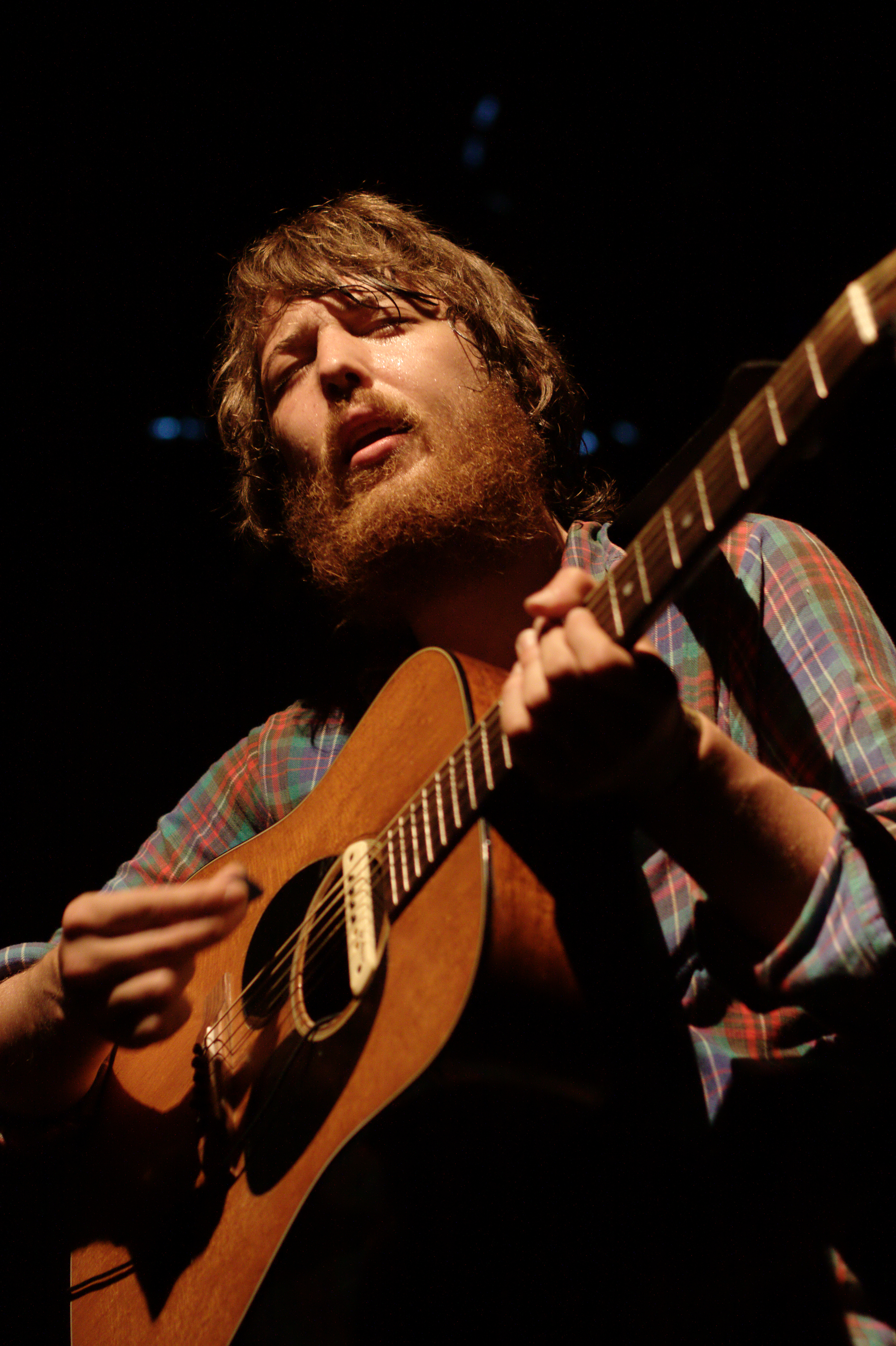
The album's lyricist, Robin Pecknold, was inspired by nature.

Though the band was courted by larger, major record labels, sparking a bidding war, they chose to sign with Sub Pop, a Seattle-based independent label. The news was first announced in January 2008. Pecknold was apprehensive about the move, perceiving that the recording quality of Fleet Foxes would be unrepresentative of the label's style. He confided in the label that he hoped for the album to fail, so they could begin writing their next one. Overseas distribution was handled by the hip British imprint Bella Union. Preceding the release of the album, Fleet Foxes also issued Sun Giant, an extended play later bundled with the vinyl edition of the LP. Sun Giant was recorded in only eight days, after the recording of Fleet Foxes, but was released first. It was intended to only be sold at concerts, but its popularity only served to bolster the group's burgeoning breakthrough.

In response to growing hype, Sub Pop adjusted its promotional plans to what they might suggest for the label's top artists. They conducted listening parties and streamed the album on aughts digital platforms like AOL and MySpace. Pecknold used the latter to update listeners on what to expect with the new album. The album's rollout was a family affair: Pecknold's brother, Sean, directed a music video, while his mother initially handled accounting. Pecknold's sister was a rock critic at Seattle Weekly, helping to secure coverage. The album was also distributed at Starbucks locations.

Fleet Foxes debuted on the Billboard 200 at number 83. It sold 8,000 units in its opening week, making it Sub Pop's second-biggest sales week of that year, behind Flight of the Conchords. Within the course of the year, the musicians went from complete obscurity to worldwide fame. By the end of the year, the album had moved over 120,000 copies in North America, and 200,000 copies in Europe. It was Bella Union's first gold certified record. By November 2013, it had sold over 500,000 copies in the United States.

== Reception ==
Professional ratings
Aggregate scores
Source	Rating
Metacritic	87/100
Review scores
Source	Rating
AllMusic	5/5 stars
The A.V. Club	B+
Entertainment Weekly	A
The Guardian	5/5 stars
Mojo	5/5 stars
NME	7/10
Pitchfork	9.0/10
Q	4/5 stars
Rolling Stone	4/5 stars
Spin	4/5 stars

Fleet Foxes received widespread acclaim from the music critics. At Metacritic, which assigns a normalized rating out of 100 to reviews from mainstream critics, the album has an average score of 87 out of 100 based on 31 reviews, indicating "universal acclaim". The Guardian described it to be "a landmark in American music, an instant classic". Similar praise was put upon the album by AllMusic, which stated that "Fleet Foxes is such a satisfying, self-assured debut".

Uncut magazine awarded the album their inaugural Uncut Award in 2008 for "the most rewarding album of the past 12 months". Q magazine voted it the second best album of 2008 while it topped The Times "100 best records of 2008" list. and captured the No. 3 slot on WERS Boston's Top 50 of 2008 list. The album was also reviewed on the 'In A Word' section of the weekly podcast EGGCAST, where it was described as 'cosy' and 'organic'. Mojo gave the debut the seldom-awarded "Instant Classic" label. Until Joanna Newsom's Have One On Me in the April 2010 issue, it was the last album to receive this honor. Geddy Lee of Rush included this album among his favourites in a list from an interview with The Quietus. The album was ranked No. 36 on Rolling Stone's 2013 list of the 40 Greatest Stoner Albums, and 88th on The Guardian's 100 Best Albums of the 21st Century list, based on a 2019 poll of music writers.

=== Accolades ===
Publication	Country	Accolade	Year	Rank
Amazon.com	US	Best Music of 2008 (Editors' Pick)	2008	3
Drowned in Sound	UK	50 Best Albums of the Year	2008	45
Q	UK	50 Best Albums of the Year	2008	2
Rolling Stone	US	50 Best Albums of the Year	2008	11
Spin	US	40 Best Albums of the Year	2008	5
The Times	UK	100 Best Albums of the Year	2008	1
Pitchfork	US	50 Best Albums of the Year	2008	1
Billboard.com	US	10 Best Albums of the Year (Critics’ Choice)	2008	1
Paste	US	Top 50 Albums of 2008	2008	6
WERS Boston	US	Top 50 Albums of 2008	2008	3
Under the Radar	US	Best of 2008	2008	1
No Ripcord	UK	Top 50 Albums of 2008	2008	1
Mojo	UK	Top 50 Albums of 2008	2008	1
Dagbladet	Norway	Top International Albums of 2008	2008	9
The Know	Australia	Top 10 Albums of 2008	2008	5
Rolling Stone	US	100 Best Albums of the Decade	2009	47
Rhapsody	US	100 Best Albums of the Decade	2009	56
1001 Albums You Must Hear Before You Die	US	1001 Albums You Must Hear Before You Die	2009	N/A

== Touring and reaction ==
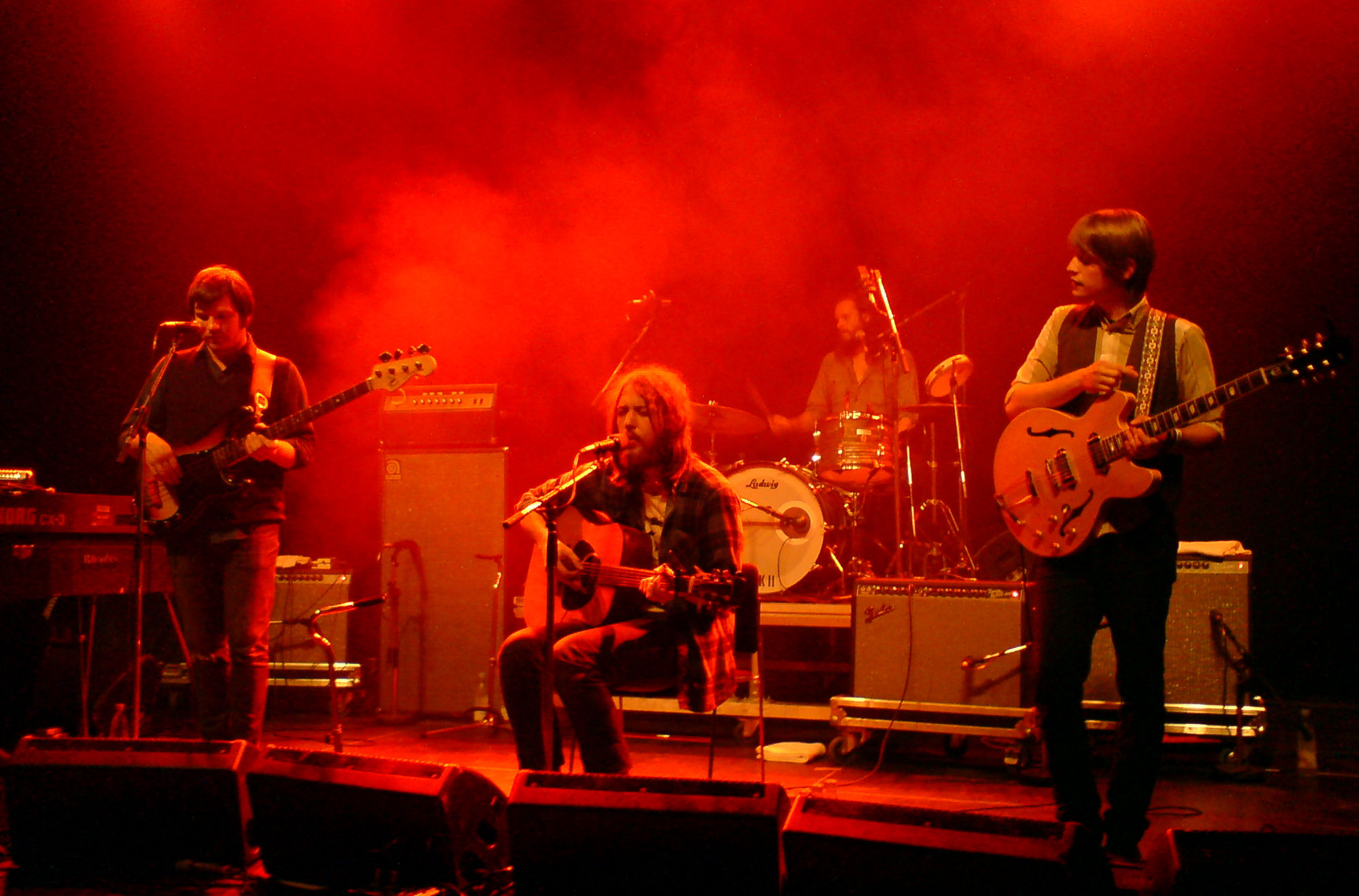
The band performing in Copenhagen in 2008.

The touring cycle for Fleet Foxes was far larger than the band had anticipated: it encompassed four North American legs, three European tours, Australia and New Zealand. The band toured with Blitzen Trapper in the early part of the year. The group made a significant stop at that year's South by Southwest, which drew the plaudit of tastemakers. The band's performance was received breathlessly, prompting high-profile press pieces in major publications, like Rolling Stone. The band were booked to open a tour with Wilco; at one stop, the band took the stage to duet an encore, "I Shall Be Released". They also promoted the LP with appearances at the late-night programs Saturday Night Live and the Late Show with David Letterman. The band initiated their first overseas tour in the United Kingdom that June. For Pecknold, the success of the tour helped to cover existing credit card debt he ensued in the making of the album.

Fleet Foxes drew wide praise, and was quickly applauded as a modern classic. For Pecknold, the reaction was surprising: "Disbelief is the only sane reaction," he told an interviewer. The band were part of a wave of softer, more broody indie rock, including Bon Iver and the Cave Singers.

== Track listing ==
All songs written by Robin Pecknold.

=== Disc one ===
No.	Title	Length
1.	"Sun It Rises"	3:14
2.	"White Winter Hymnal"	2:27
3.	"Ragged Wood"	5:07
4.	"Tiger Mountain Peasant Song"	3:28
5.	"Quiet Houses"	3:32
6.	"He Doesn't Know Why"	3:20
7.	"Heard Them Stirring"	3:02
8.	"Your Protector"	4:09
9.	"Meadowlarks"	3:11
10.	"Blue Ridge Mountains"	4:25
11.	"Oliver James"	3:23

=== Disc two (2008 Limited Edition) ===
No.	Title	Length
1.	"Sun Giant"	2:06
2.	"Drops in the River"	4:11
3.	"English House"	4:48
4.	"Mykonos" (alternate version)	3:39
5.	"Isles"	3:06

=== Disc two (2009 Japanese Limited Edition) ===
No.	Title	Length
1.	"Sun Giant"	2:14
2.	"Drops in the River"	4:12
3.	"English House"	4:40
4.	"Mykonos"	4:35
5.	"Innocent Son"	3:06
6.	"False Knight on the Road"	3:45

== Personnel ==
Fleet Foxes

- Robin Pecknold – lead vocals, guitar
- Skyler Skjelset – lead guitar
- Nicholas Peterson – drums, vocals
- Casey Wescott – keyboards, vocals
- Craig Curran – bass, vocals

Additional instrumental personnel

- Gwen Owen – flute on "Your Protector"

Production personnel

- Phil Ek – producer, engineer, mixer
- Ed Brooks – mastering
- Sasha Barr – design
- Dusty Summers – design

The liner notes do not state which instruments the band members play. Former drummer J. Tillman joined the group after recordings had been completed, but before the album was released.

== Charts ==
=== Weekly charts ===
Chart (2008–2009)	Peak position
Australian Albums (ARIA)	90
Belgian Albums (Ultratop Flanders)	12
Belgian Albums (Ultratop Wallonia)	88
Danish Albums (Hitlisten)	36
Dutch Albums (Album Top 100)	39
French Albums (SNEP)	78
German Albums (Offizielle Top 100)	51
Irish Albums (IRMA)	23
Italian Albums (FIMI)	51
Norwegian Albums (VG-lista)	14
Swedish Albums (Sverigetopplistan)	16
UK Albums (Official Charts)	3
US Billboard 200	36
US Independent Albums (Billboard)	2

=== Year-end charts ===
Chart (2008)	Position
UK Albums (OCC)	162
Chart (2009)	Position
Belgian Albums (Ultratop Flanders)	34
UK Albums (OCC)	38

== Certifications ==
Region	Certification	Certified units/sales
Belgium (BRMA)	Gold	15,000^{*}
New Zealand (RMNZ)	Gold	7,500^{‡}
United Kingdom (BPI)	Platinum	534,385
United States (RIAA)	Platinum	1,000,000^{‡}
^{*} Sales figures based on certification alone.^{‡} Sales+streaming figures based on certification alone.
