= Hearst Greek Theatre =

Greek Theatre owned and operated by UC Berkeley in Berkeley, California

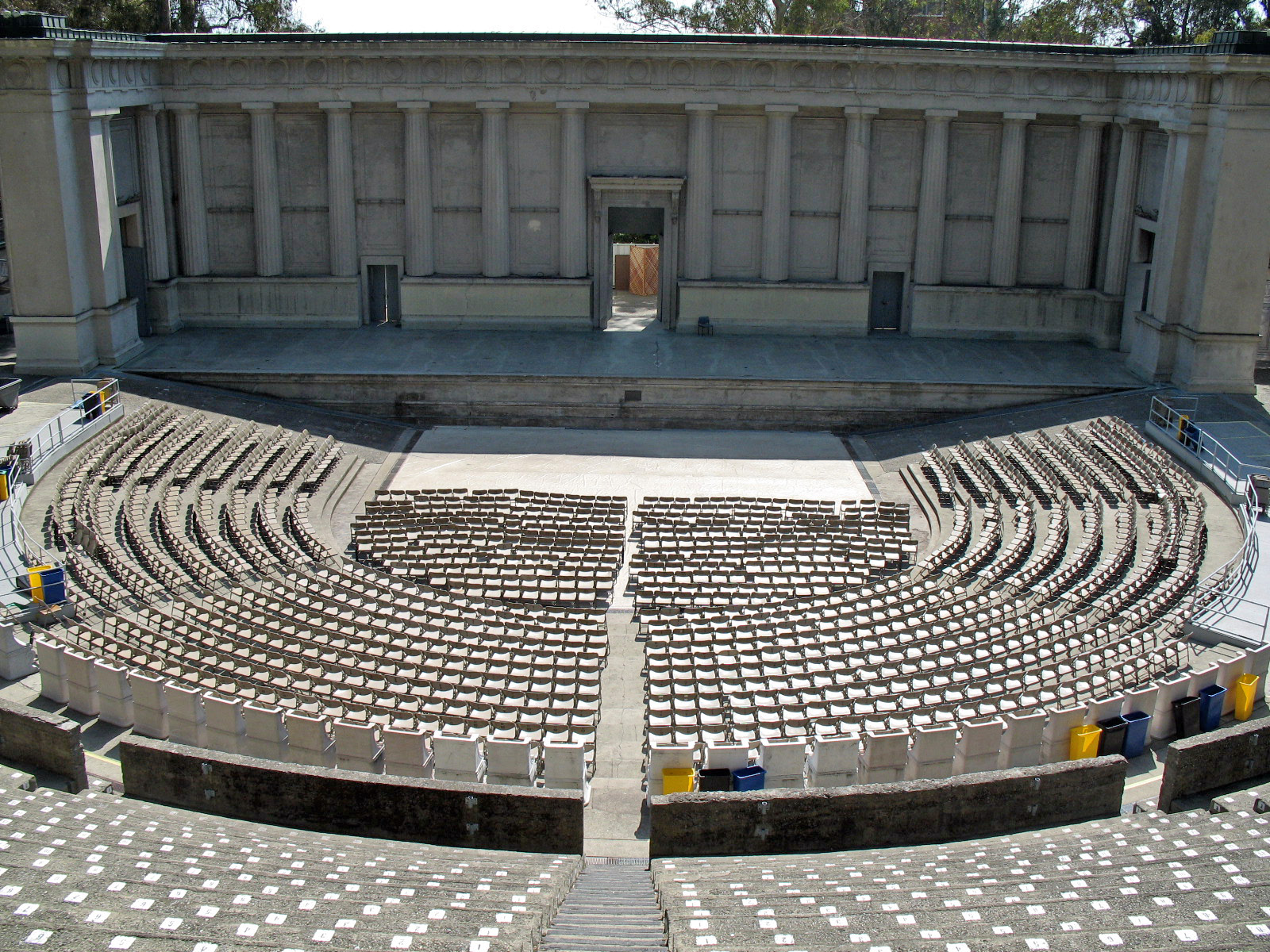
- Interactive map of Hearst Greek Theatre
- Address: 2001 Gayley Rd
- Location: Berkeley, California
- Owner: University of California, Berkeley
- Operator: concerts promoted by Another Planet Entertainment
- Capacity: 8,500
- Type: amphitheater

Construction
- Opened: 1903

Website
- http://calperformances.org/visit/venues/greek-theatre.php
- Hearst Greek Theatre
- U.S. National Register of Historic Places
- Berkeley Landmark
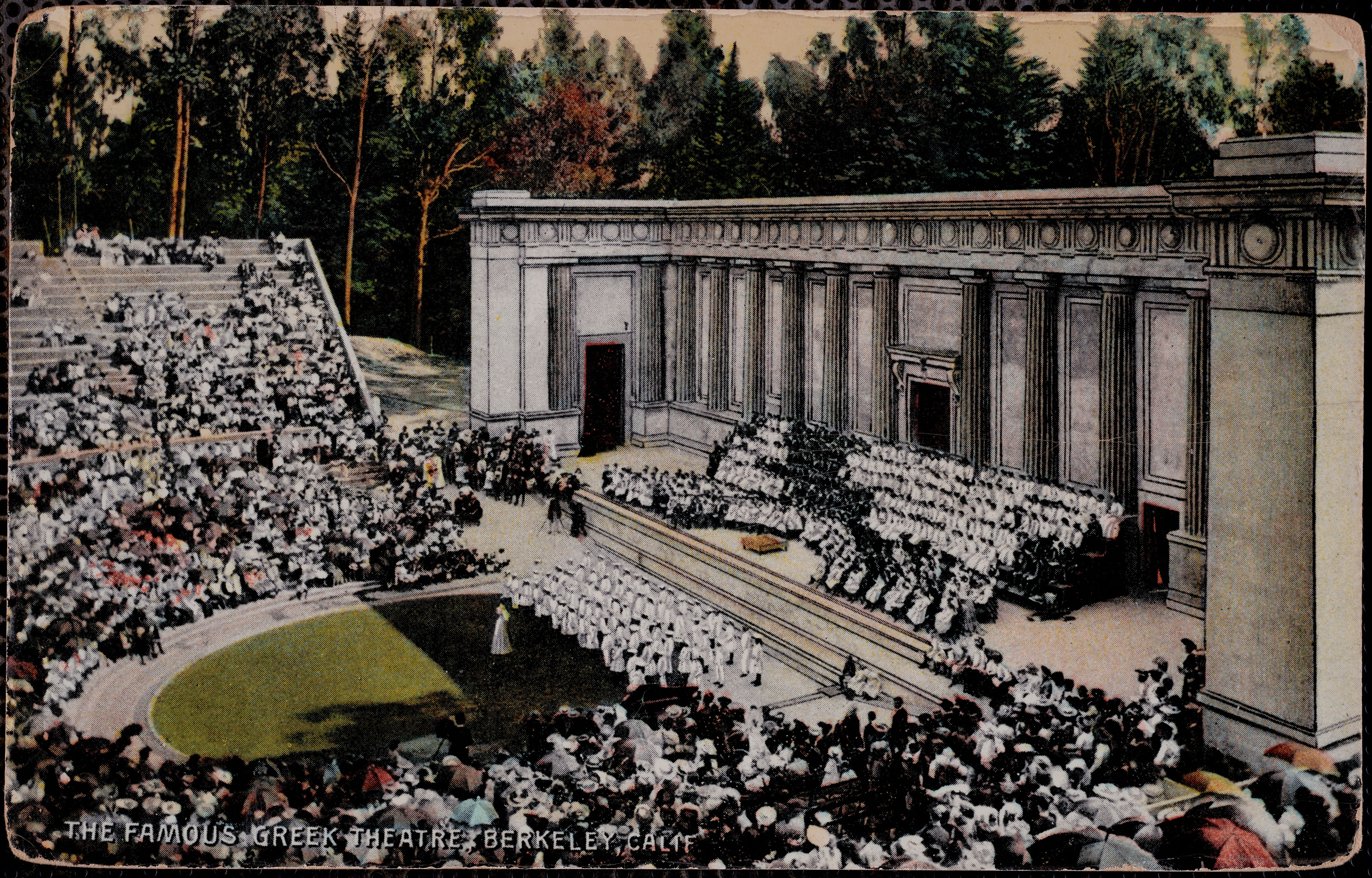

- Location within Oakland, California Location within California Location within the United States
- Coordinates: 37°52′25.3″N 122°15′15.1″W
- Architect: John Galen Howard
- Architectural style: Greek Revival
- MPS: Berkeley, University of California MRA
- NRHP reference No.: 82004644
- BERKL No.: 153

Significant dates
- Added to NRHP: March 25, 1982
- Designated BERKL: February 25, 1991

The William Randolph Hearst Greek Theatre, known locally as simply the Greek Theatre, is an 8,500-seat Greek Theatre owned and operated by the University of California, Berkeley in Berkeley, California, United States.

The Greek Theatre hosts The Berkeley Jazz Festival, pop, rock, and world music concerts, UC Berkeley graduation ceremonies, occasional addresses by noted speakers, and other events. Past speakers include President Theodore Roosevelt, William Randolph Hearst, Bishop Desmond Tutu, and the Dalai Lama.

== Architecture ==
The Hearst Greek Theater was built in 1903 on the site of a rough outdoor bowl already in use as an amphitheater since 1894 known as "Ben Weed's Amphitheater". The project was championed by University of California president Benjamin Ide Wheeler. Its construction was financed by newspaper magnate William Randolph Hearst, after whom it was named.

The Greek Theatre was the first university building designed by John Galen Howard. Architect Julia Morgan assisted with the design. The design of the theater is based directly on the ancient Greek theater of Epidaurus.

In 1957, a basement backstage area was added, which was designed by architect Ernest Born. It includes a large plaza flanked by two stage-level constructions.

It was listed on the National Register of Historic Places in 1982.

In May 2012, a seismic retrofit and expansion was designed by Palo Alto architecture firm, CAW Architects and constructed by Overaa Construction. Four new reinforced concrete columns were added and concealed in the original structure.

== History ==
The Greek Theatre officially opened on September 24, 1903, with a student production of The Birds by Aristophanes. However, while still under construction in May 1903, the theatre hosted a graduation ceremony with an address by President Theodore Roosevelt, who was a friend of Wheeler's from New York.

In 1967 The Grateful Dead played the Greek for the first time, and went on to play a total of twenty-nine concerts by 1989. The Jerry Garcia Band also played concerts at the Greek on four occasions.

Over the years, the Greek Theatre has seen performances from hundreds of musical and theatrical artists. The Greek has also long been the venue for a number of annual events including departmental graduation ceremonies, the commencement convocation for graduating seniors, and the Bonfire Rally before the Big Game each year with Stanford. Charter Day ceremonies and inaugurations of University of California presidents and Berkeley chancellors have been held at the Greek Theatre with certain exceptions, such as the 1962 Charter Day ceremony at which President John F. Kennedy spoke—held at California Memorial Stadium for its larger capacity.

Another Planet Entertainment became the exclusive concert promoter at the Greek in 2004.

== Physical structure ==
The Greek Theatre is a solid structure characterized by two main components: seating and stage. Positioned in a natural amphitheater just north of Bowles Hall, above Gayley Road, the site takes advantage of the hill's semicircular shape, creating an open-air space oriented towards the west.

The seating area features a grassy mound at the top of the bowl, leading to 19 rows of concrete benches that cascade down the slope, forming a semi-circle facing the elevated Classical stage on the western side. The configuration includes 11 aisles, with 9 entrances at the top and 11 at the bottom. The lowest tiers, nearest to the stage, boast 28 intricately carved stone chairs. Surrounding the stage are high walls with attached Doric columns and entablatures on three sides, enclosed at both ends by square piers. The central stage entrance is a striking feature, comprising a monumental doorway in an aedicule form with a Classic entablature supported by consoles, adorned with egg and dart molding. Secondary entrances are positioned at the sides of the stage. The backstage area is flanked by storage and utility spaces to the north and south. Access to the main theater is provided through a series of terraces and staircases made of aggregate concrete, located north and south of the stage. Notably, Walter Steilberg, the consulting engineer for the 1957 remodeling, reported the absence of evidence for steel reinforcing in the structure according to his findings.

== Significance ==
The Greek Theatre's architectural significance and its integration with the surrounding environment are integral aspects of its appeal. Echoing this sentiment, Howard remarked, "Combining as it does the monumental and festive character, this form of building is at once impressive and graceful…The pure, simple, big classic forms harmonize exquisitely with the forms of hill and canyon." This blend of grandeur and elegance encapsulates the essence of the structure, reflecting the intellectual and democratic ideals of the early University. Notably, it was the first permanent outdoor theatre in the state, inspired by Greek prototypes.

Referred to as "this noble ensemble of building, sky and garden" by architect Ernest Born, the Greek Theatre has long stood as a symbol of the University's ethos. While not initially part of the University's plans, it became the inaugural completed project of John Galen Howard's architectural vision.

Originally known as "Ben Weed's Amphitheater," after its discoverer, the site had hosted the annual Senior Extravaganza since 1894. President Benjamin Ide Wheeler advocated for its transformation into a more substantial venue for University events, with funding secured from William Randolph Hearst. Architectural historian Joan Draper highlights the parallels perceived between Berkeley and Greek life by key figures involved in the project.

Modeled after the theater at Epidaurus, Howard envisioned elaborate enhancements, including caryatids crowning the back wall and a double colonnade encircling the seating area for 10,000 attendees, all to be clad in marble. However, financial constraints led to scaled-back plans, with private donors contributing inscribed marble chairs based on Greek designs. Collaboration between Howard and Julia Morgan on the plans, possibly including supervision of construction, further enriched the project's legacy.

The Greek Theatre saw its first use, albeit incomplete, on May 16, 1903, hosting President Theodore Roosevelt's commencement address. Formal dedication occurred on September 24, 1903, featuring selections from Aristophanes' The Birds performed in the original Greek. In 1957, Ernest Born introduced enhancements such as new dressing rooms, approaches, lighting, and a roof. These additions, discreetly integrated or separated from the main structure, complement rather than detract from its architectural integrity.

== Gallery ==
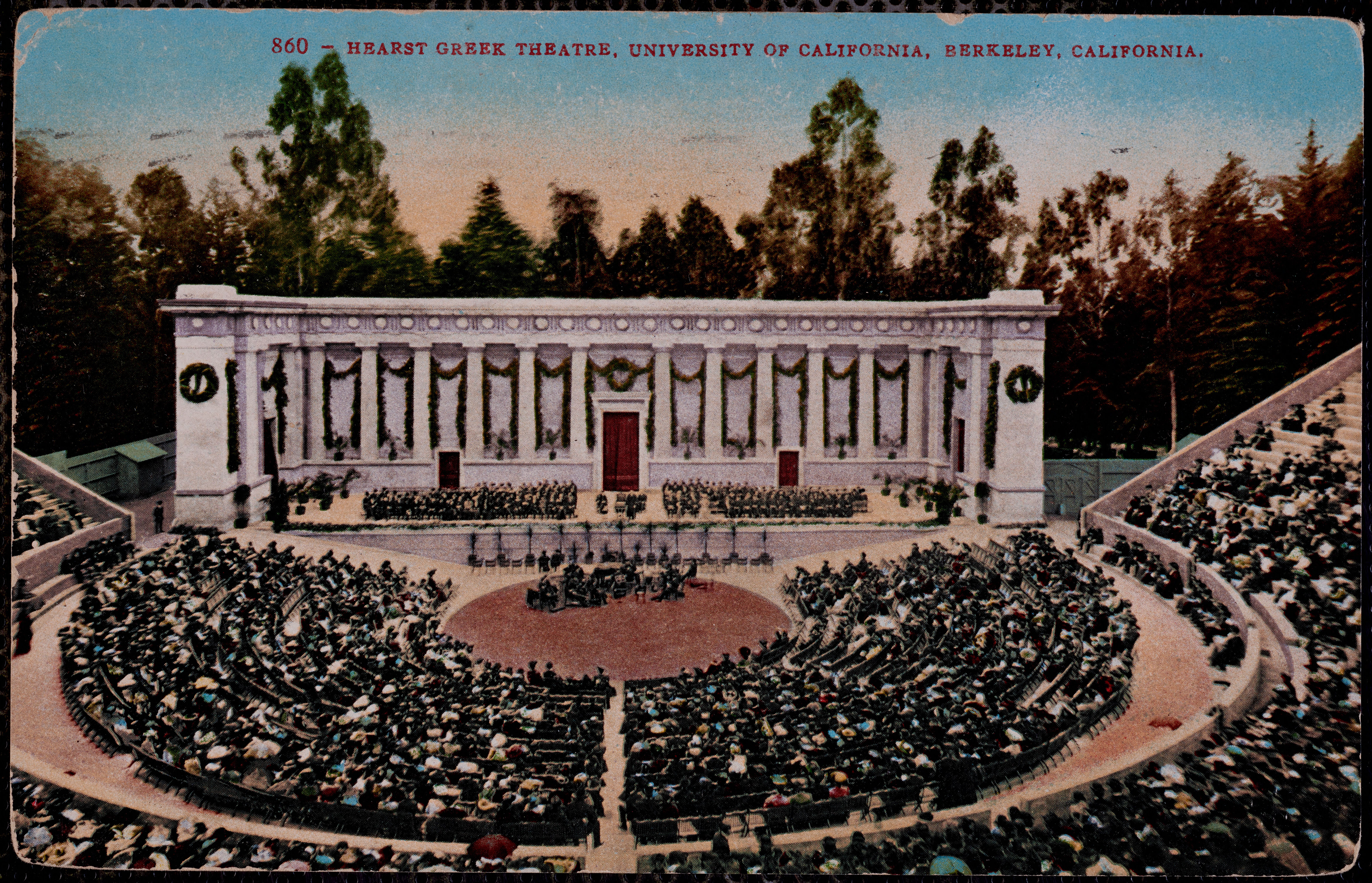
Hearst Greek Theatre, University of California, Berkeley, California, [ca. 1907–April 4, 1911]. Nicholas Catsimpoolas Collection, Boston Public Library

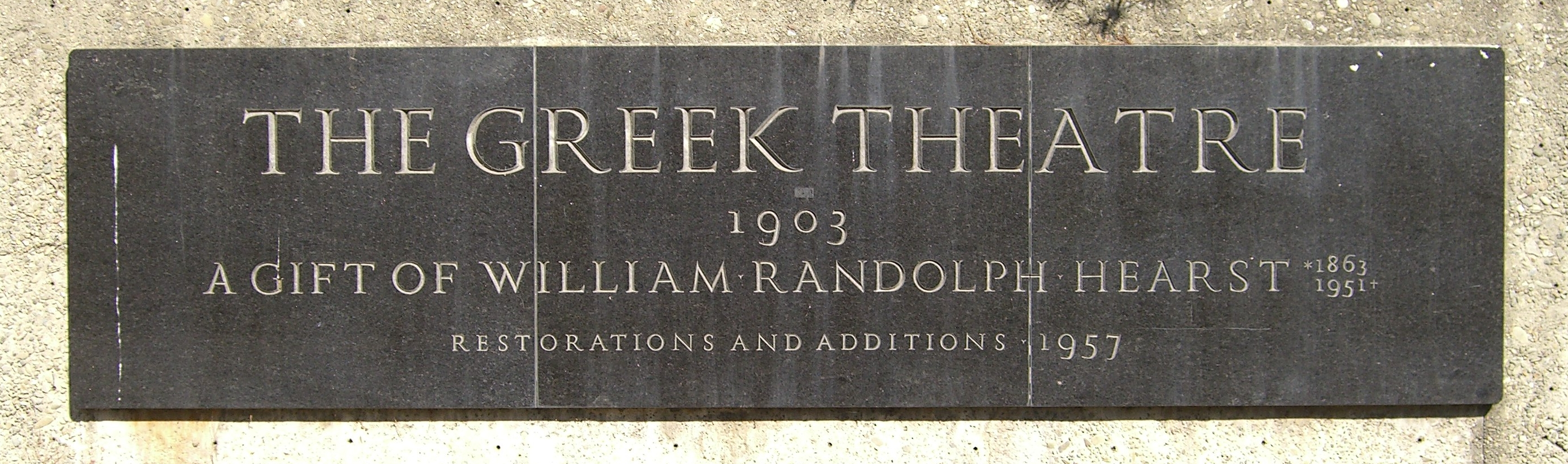
Official plaque

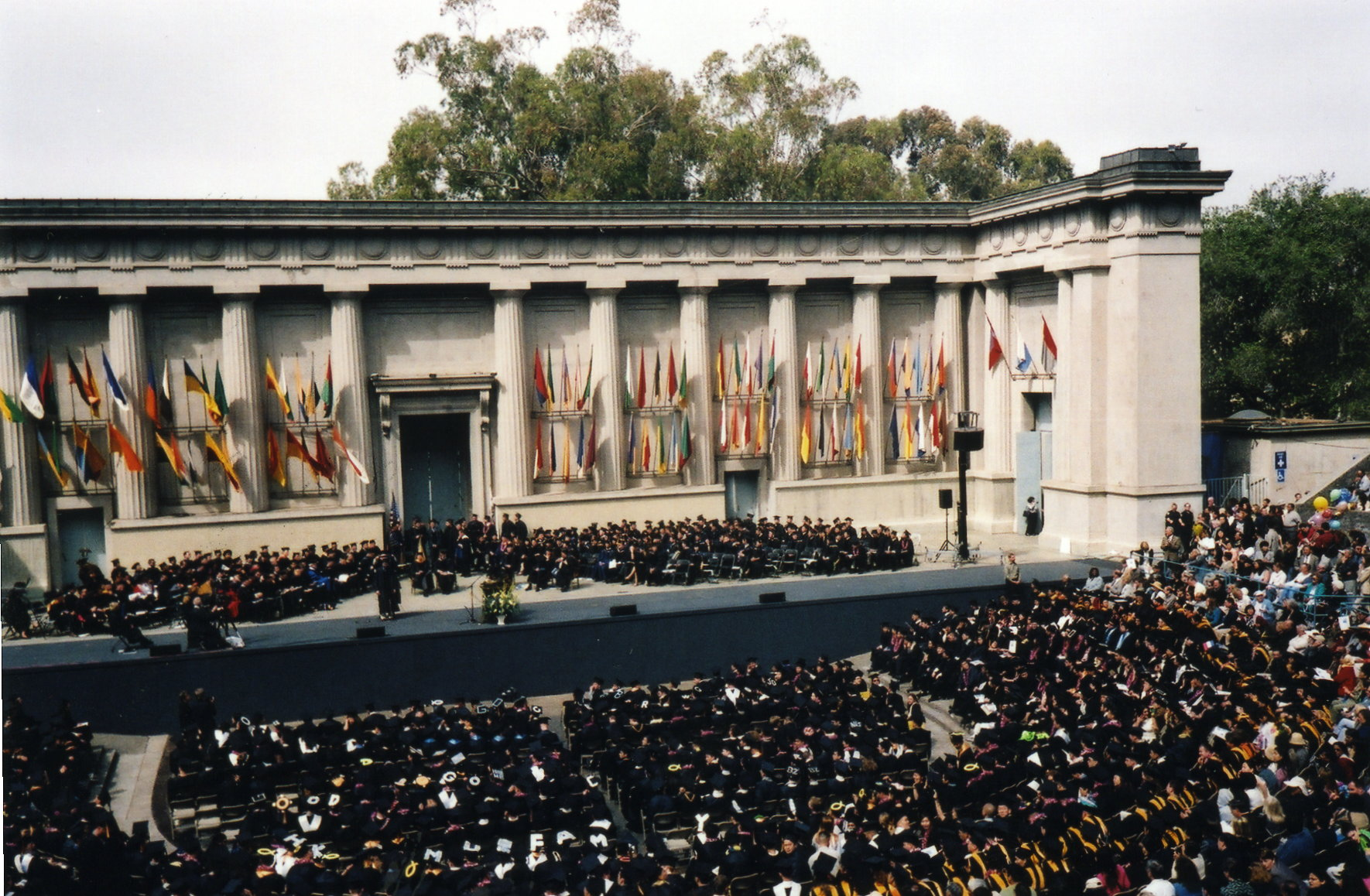
During graduation in 2002

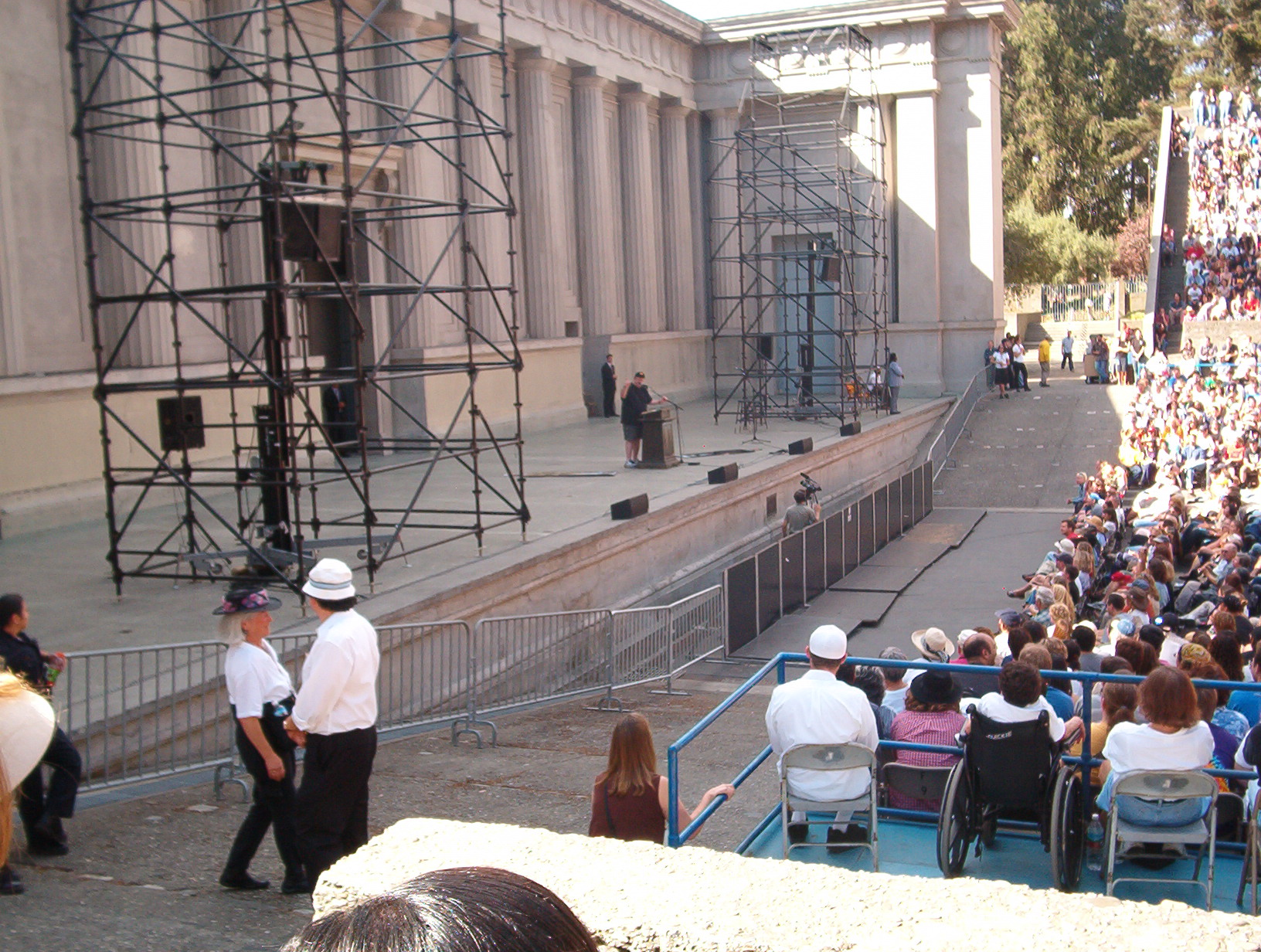
Michael Moore giving a speech in October 2003.

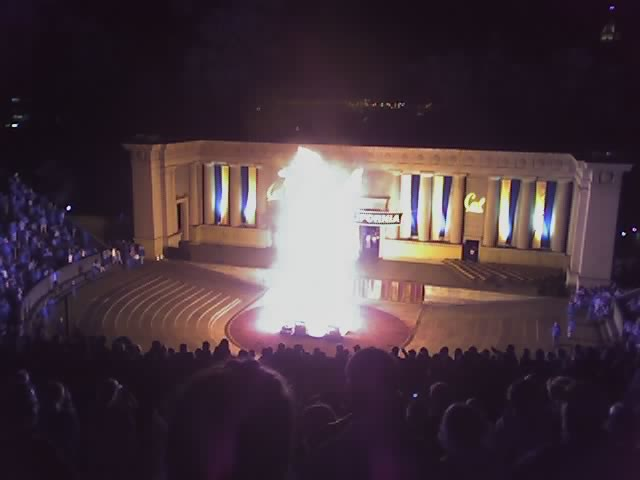
Cal Bonfire on December 1, 2006

== See also ==
- List of contemporary amphitheatres
- Greek Theatre (Los Angeles)
