= Helplessness Blues =

Studio album by Fleet Foxes
- Released: May 3, 2011
- Recorded: 2010
- Studios: Reciprocal Recording, Seattle; Dreamland Recording, West Hurley, New York; Bear Creek, Woodinville, Washington; Avast Recording, Seattle
- Genres: Indie folk; chamber pop; folk rock; folk-pop; indie rock
- Length: 49:56
- Labels: Sub Pop; Bella Union
- Producers: Fleet Foxes; Phil Ek

Fleet Foxes chronology
Fleet Foxes (2008)	Helplessness Blues (2011)	Crack-Up (2017)

Singles from Fleet Foxes
- 1. "Helplessness Blues" Released: January 31, 2011; 2. "Grown Ocean" Released: 2011; 3. "Battery Kinzie" Released: 2011; 4. "Lorelai" Released: 2011

Helplessness Blues is the second studio album by American band Fleet Foxes, released on May 3, 2011, by Sub Pop and Bella Union. The album received universal acclaim from critics, going on to be nominated for Best Folk Album at the 54th Annual Grammy Awards. The release peaked at number 4 on the Billboard 200, the band's highest position on the chart to date. To support the album, the Fleet Foxes embarked on a worldwide Helplessness Blues Tour.

Helplessness Blues is the band's first studio album to feature bass guitarist Christian Wargo and multi-instrumentalist Morgan Henderson. It is also the only Fleet Foxes album to feature drummer and backing vocalist Josh Tillman, who left the band in 2012 to pursue his solo career under the name Father John Misty.

== Recording ==
Robin Pecknold had initially hoped that Fleet Foxes could have released their second album in 2009; however, the band's touring schedule had caused them some setbacks. They got together to rehearse new songs in February 2009 in a rented house outside Seattle, but the sessions were mostly scrapped, costing the band $60,000 of their own money. After their tour in support of the 2008 releases ended, Pecknold mentioned the possibility of starting to record new songs, but Josh Tillman, Fleet Foxes' drummer and co-song arranger, was scheduled to play Europe and North America all along the 2009-10 winter as part of his solo musical act.

Added to this, Phil Ek, the band's producer and friend answered in an interview that he was likely to continue as the producer as Robin had already sent him some demos to start listening to. In an interview with Pitchfork Media, Pecknold stated he expected the album to be released sometime in the second half of 2010. In an interview with Rolling Stone Magazine, Pecknold admitted that his girlfriend of five years found the stress this album placed on their relationship too much, and ended things. Upon hearing the completed album, she realized that Pecknold's efforts were worth it, and they tried to work it out. The couple has since split up.

Pecknold has come out saying for their second album he tried to sound "less poppy, less upbeat and more groove-based". Taking inspiration from Roy Harper's folk album Stormcock, or at least its 12-string guitar he said: "That will be the primary sonic distancing from the last record". Added to this, he stated they wanted to record very quickly, saying he wanted to do the "vocal takes in one go, so even if there are fuck-ups, I want them to be on there. I want there to be guitar mistakes. I want there to be not totally flawless vocals. I want to record it and have that kind of cohesive sound. Van Morrison's Astral Weeks, to me, is the best-sounding album because it sounds like there were only six hours in the universe for that album to be recorded in. So I want it to have that feeling."

The band had recorded since April 2010 in different locations (including West Hurley, New York) after two years of writing material and decided to scrap the earlier idea of a fast recording (though according to the band, the vocal takes so far have all been done in one take, perhaps in line with the original imperfect recording idea).

== Release ==
The album cover was illustrated by a Seattle artist Toby Liebowitz and painted by artist Christopher Anderson. The title track, "Helplessness Blues" was released via free download on January 31, 2011, and the album's fourth track, "Battery Kinzie" premiered on Zane Lowe's show on March 22. Their record label, Sub Pop, also released a downloadable music video made up of recording and other miscellaneous footage set to "Grown Ocean" on its site in support of the album. For Record Store Day on April 16, the band released a 12" double A-side single of the title track backed with "Grown Ocean" in the US and with "Battery Kinzie" in Europe.

On November 1, the video for "The Shrine / An Argument" was released via Sub Pop's YouTube account and Sean Pecknold's Vimeo account.

== Composition ==
On Helplessness Blues, Fleet Foxes take on indie folk, chamber pop, and "meticulous, expansive" folk rock. It also sees them craft a baroque folk-pop style.

Their debut's Americana is also exchanged for a bigger psychedelic folk influence, particularly the kind from 1960s-era Britain.

== Critical reception ==
Professional ratings
Aggregate scores
Source	Rating
AnyDecentMusic?	8.1/10
Metacritic	85/100
Review scores
Source	Rating
AllMusic	4/5 stars
The A.V. Club	A
Entertainment Weekly	B−
The Guardian	4/5 stars
The Independent	5/5 stars
Los Angeles Times	3.5/4 stars
NME	4/10
Pitchfork	8.8/10
Rolling Stone	4/5 stars
Spin	9/10

Helplessness Blues received widespread critical acclaim from contemporary music critics. At Metacritic, which assigns a normalized rating out of 100 to reviews from mainstream critics, the album received an average score of 85 based on 42 reviews, which indicates "universal acclaim". Larry Fitzmaurice of Pitchfork wrote that the album's "analytical and inquisitive nature never tips into self-indulgence" and that "amidst the chaos, the record showcases the band's expanded range and successful risk-taking, while retaining what so many people fell in love with about the group in the first place." Chris Martins of The A.V. Club praised the album's "sophisticated, truth-seeking songs", while Alexis Petridis of The Guardian called it "almost laughably beautiful." Andy Gill, writing in The Independent, felt that Fleet Foxes "manage to make giant strides creatively without jettisoning their core sound." Robert Christgau, who was dismissive of the band's previous releases, gave the album a one-star honorable mention, indicating "a worthy effort consumers attuned to its overriding aesthetic or individual vision may well like," and declared it "darker and more socially conscious than either their escapist admirers or their ideological detractors are equipped to notice."

The album was nominated for Best Folk Album at the 54th Annual Grammy Awards.

=== Accolades ===
Publication	Accolade	Year	Rank
Consequence of Sound	Top 50 Albums of 2011	2011	14
The Guardian	The Best Albums of 2011	2011	20
Paste	The 50 Best Albums of 2011	2011	2
Paste	The 50 Best Indie Rock Albums of the 2010s	2019	18
Paste	The 100 Best Indie Folk Albums of All Time	2020	33
Pitchfork	The Top 50 Albums of 2011	2011	15
Pitchfork	The 200 Best Albums of the 2010s	2019	135
PopMatters	The 75 Best Albums of 2011	2011	1
Rolling Stone	50 Best Albums of 2011	2011	4
Spin	The 50 Best Albums of 2011	2011	33
Stereogum	Top 50 Albums of 2011	2011	31
Uncut	The Top 50 Albums of 2011	2011	12

== Track listing ==
All tracks are written by Robin Pecknold, arranged by Fleet Foxes.

No.	Title	Length
1.	"Montezuma"	3:36
2.	"Bedouin Dress"	4:30
3.	"Sim Sala Bim"	3:14
4.	"Battery Kinzie"	2:50
5.	"The Plains / Bitter Dancer"	5:54
6.	"Helplessness Blues"	5:02
7.	"The Cascades"	2:08
8.	"Lorelai"	4:25
9.	"Someone You'd Admire"	2:30
10.	"The Shrine / An Argument"	8:06
11.	"Blue Spotted Tail"	3:05
12.	"Grown Ocean"	4:36
Total length:		49:56

== Credits and personnel ==
Credits adapted from the album's liner notes.

=== Musicians ===
Fleet Foxes

- Robin Pecknold – vocals, acoustic guitar, electric guitar, piano, fiddle, mandolin, hammer dulcimer, harmonium, Moog, lever harp, Prophet
- Skyler Skjelset – acoustic guitar, electric guitar, mandolin, water harp
- Casey Wescott – piano, pump organ, Marxophone, music box, Crumar bass, Moog, Tremoloa, Tibetan singing bowls, harmonium, harpsichord, Mellotron, additional vocal harmony arrangements
- Josh Tillman – vocals, drum kit, percussion
- Christian Wargo – vocals, electric bass guitar
- Morgan Henderson – upright bass, woodwinds

Additional musicians

- Alina To – violin on "Bedouin Dress" and "The Shrine / An Argument"
- Bill Patton – pedal and lap steel guitar on "Grown Ocean"
- Hanna Benn – string arrangement assistance on "Bedouin Dress"

=== Recording ===
- Phil Ek – co-producer, engineer, mixing
- Greg Calbi – mastering at Sterling Sound
- Adam Armstrong – recording assistant
- Trevor Spencer – recording assistant
- Jonny Mendoza – recording assistant
- Cathy Ferrante – recording assistant
- Jay Follette – recording assistant
- Brian Kornfeld – recording assistant
- Davey Brozowski – recording assistant

Studios

- Reciprocal Recording – Seattle, Washington
  - January to December 2010
- Dreamland Studios – West Hurley, New York
  - Twelve days in April 2010
- Bear Creek Studios – Woodinville, Washington
  - Ten days in July 2010
- Avast Recording – Seattle, Washington
  - Four weeks mixing and recording, Fall 2010
- Loud noises recorded at the Fort Worden water cistern

=== Art ===
- Toby Liebowitz – cover mind-map illustration
- Chris Alderson – color
- Sean Pecknold – photo collage, design, all photography
- Olivia Park-Sargent – sunburst painting
- Robin Pecknold – type design
- Dusty Summers – design

== Charts ==
=== Weekly charts ===
Chart (2011)	Peak position
Australian Albums (ARIA)	6
Austrian Albums (Ö3 Austria)	29
Belgian Albums (Ultratop Flanders)	2
Belgian Albums (Ultratop Wallonia)	25
Canadian Albums (Billboard)	8
Danish Albums (Hitlisten)	18
Dutch Albums (Album Top 100)	5
Finnish Albums (Suomen virallinen lista)	16
French Albums (SNEP)	54
German Albums (Offizielle Top 100)	11
Irish Albums (IRMA)	3
Italian Albums (FIMI)	44
New Zealand Albums (RMNZ)	12
Norwegian Albums (VG-lista)	1
Portuguese Albums (AFP)	23
Scottish Albums (Official Charts)	2
Spanish Albums (Promusicae)	23
Swedish Albums (Sverigetopplistan)	3
Swiss Albums (Schweizer Hitparade)	31
UK Albums (Official Charts)	2
US Billboard 200	4
US Top Rock Albums (Billboard)	2

=== Year-end charts ===
Chart (2011)	Position
Belgian Albums (Ultratop Flanders)	63
Swedish Albums (Sverigetopplistan)	85
UK Albums (OCC)	81
US Billboard 200	123
US Top Rock Albums (Billboard)	18

== Certifications ==
Region	Certification	Certified units/sales
Portugal (AFP)	Gold	10,000^{^}
United Kingdom (BPI)	Gold	164,918
United States (RIAA)	Gold	500,000^{‡}
^{^} Shipments figures based on certification alone.^{‡} Sales+streaming figures based on certification alone.
