= Mykonos (song) =

Single by Fleet Foxes

from the album Sun Giant
- B-side: "Tiger Mountain Peasant Song" (live) (UK version); "False Knight On the Road" (U.S. version)
- Released: January 27, 2009 (UK version); May 5, 2009 (US version)
- Recorded: 2007
- Genre: Folk rock; baroque folk
- Length: 4:35
- Label: Bella Union; Sub Pop
- Songwriter: Robin Pecknold
- Producer: Phil Ek

Fleet Foxes singles chronology
"He Doesn't Know Why" (2008)	"Mykonos" (2009)	"Your Protector" (2009)

Music video
- "Mykonos" on YouTube

"Mykonos" is a song by American indie folk band Fleet Foxes, from their second EP Sun Giant (2008). It was released in the UK on January 27, 2009, by European label Bella Union; in the format of 7" vinyl as well as a digital download, and peaked at number 51 on the UK Singles Chart. The B-side is a live version of "Tiger Mountain Peasant Song" from their debut album. On May 5, 2009, it was released in the U.S. on Seattle-based record label Sub Pop, with the song "False Knight On the Road" in place of "Tiger Mountain Peasant Song". An alternate version of the song, with a track length of 3:39, was released on the deluxe version of their debut album Fleet Foxes.

== Track listing ==
All songs written by Robin Pecknold.

UK version

No.	Title	Length
1.	"Mykonos"	4:35
2.	"Tiger Mountain Peasant Song (live)"	3:55

US version

No.	Title	Length
1.	"Mykonos"	4:35
2.	"False Knight on the Road"	3:46

== Music video ==
A music video was made for "Mykonos", and was directed by Sean Pecknold, singer Robin Pecknold's brother. It is entirely animated and is described by Pitchfork.tv as:

"[The]... video imagines a fluid universe filled with triangles, castles and barbershop mustaches. It's a little playful... and a little creepy."

It depicts a pair of small origami triangles (representing feet) on an adventure through a world made solely of paper. They begin, sliding and falling downwards, onto various objects and buildings which collapse shortly after. As this happens, an evil face appears in the background, whose eyes follow the triangles. Eventually, the triangles find a bird, upon whose back they ride above the clouds, only to fall again and end up in a dark forest filled with long, thin legs walking around. They then enter a flying machine, and encounter a tall figure, which they push over a cliff, to fall with it, watched by rows of eyes. As the song slows, they continue to fall, into a fortress in which the figures walk along high walkways. It appears to be the home of the face, which is promptly destroyed by the triangles, who flee the collapsing fortress. The song fades as the triangles sink into the sea.

== Reception ==
Billboard magazine said that "the second half of 'Mykonos' is salvation for the ears". The New York Times said of the track that there are moments when "the band members' high, honeyed voices melded into an imperfect swell reminiscent of the kind of church choir John and Alan Lomax might have captured with their 500-pound recording machine."

== Certifications ==
Certifications for "Mykonos"
Region	Certification	Certified units/sales
New Zealand (RMNZ)	Platinum	30,000^{‡}
United Kingdom (BPI)	Gold	400,000^{‡}
United States (RIAA)	Platinum	1,000,000^{‡}
^{‡} Sales+streaming figures based on certification alone.
