= List of moths of Australia (Psychidae) =

Partial list of Australian moths

This is a list of the Australian moth species of the family Psychidae. It also acts as an index to the species articles and forms part of the full List of moths of Australia.

- Archaeoneura amictopis (Turner, 1923)
- Ardiosteres dryophracta Meyrick, 1917
- Ardiosteres eumelana Turner, 1917
- Ardiosteres lacerata Meyrick, 1917
- Ardiosteres moretonella (Walker, 1866)
- Ardiosteres pectinata Meyrick, 1917
- Ardiosteres sporocosma Turner, 1917
- Ardiosteres tetrazona Meyrick, 1920
- Ardiosteres tortricitella (Walker, 1866)
- Ardiosteres trifasciana (Walker, 1863)
- Ardiosteres velutinana (Walker, 1863)
- Bathromelas hyaloscopa (Meyrick & Lower, 1907)
- Cebysa leucotelus Walker, 1854
- Clania ignobilis (Walker, 1869)
- Clania lewinii (Westwood, 1855)
- Colpotorna lasiopa Meyrick, 1920
- Conoeca guildingi Scott, 1864
- Dappula tertius (Templeton, 1847)
- Elinostola agriodes Meyrick, 1921
- Elinostola hyalina Turner, 1947
- Elinostola hypomela Meyrick & Lower, 1907
- Elinostola panagria Meyrick, 1921
- Gyrophylla eumetra Turner, 1935
- Hyalarcta huebneri (Westwood, 1855)
- Hyalarcta nigrescens (Doubleday, 1845)
- Hyaloptila melanosoma Turner, 1947
- Iphierga chrysopa Turner, 1917
- Iphierga chrysophaes Turner, 1917
- Iphierga crypsilopha Lower, 1903
- Iphierga dispersa Meyrick, 1917
- Iphierga euphragma Meyrick, 1893
- Iphierga lysiphracta Meyrick, 1917
- Iphierga macarista Turner, 1917
- Iphierga magnifica (Meyrick, 1893)
- Iphierga melichrysa Lower, 1902
- Iphierga pentulias Meyrick, 1893
- Iphierga polyzona Lower, 1903
- Iphierga stasiodes Meyrick, 1893
- Lepidoscia acropolia (Turner, 1923)
- Lepidoscia adelopis (Meyrick, 1893)
- Lepidoscia amphiscia Meyrick, 1893
- Lepidoscia annosella (Walker, 1869)
- Lepidoscia apochroa (Meyrick, 1893)
- Lepidoscia arctiella (Walker, 1860)
- Lepidoscia arctodes (Meyrick, 1920)
- Lepidoscia bancrofti (T.P. Lucas, 1890)
- Lepidoscia barysema Lower, 1903
- Lepidoscia basiferana (Walker, 1863)
- Lepidoscia callista (Lower, 1903)
- Lepidoscia campylota (Lower, 1903)
- Lepidoscia carlotta (Meyrick, 1893)
- Lepidoscia cataphracta (Meyrick, 1893)
- Lepidoscia characota (Meyrick, 1893)
- Lepidoscia charitodes (Meyrick, 1893)
- Lepidoscia chloropetala Meyrick, 1893
- Lepidoscia chrysastra Turner, 1923
- Lepidoscia chrysopetala (Meyrick, 1893)
- Lepidoscia chrysura (Meyrick, 1893)
- Lepidoscia cirrhosticha (Turner, 1923)
- Lepidoscia commatica (Turner, 1933)
- Lepidoscia comochroa Meyrick, 1893
- Lepidoscia confluens (Turner, 1939)
- Lepidoscia conioptila (Turner, 1923)
- Lepidoscia crepuscularis (Meyrick, 1893)
- Lepidoscia desmophthora Meyrick, 1893
- Lepidoscia dicranota (Turner, 1923)
- Lepidoscia educta (Meyrick, 1920)
- Lepidoscia epichrysa (Lower, 1903)
- Lepidoscia epitricha (Lower, 1903)
- Lepidoscia euctena (Turner, 1927)
- Lepidoscia euryptera (Meyrick, 1893)
- Lepidoscia eurystola Lower, 1903
- Lepidoscia euscia (Lower, 1903)
- Lepidoscia euthrygramma (Turner, 1923)
- Lepidoscia gastromela (Lower, 1903)
- Lepidoscia glabrella (Walker, 1863)
- Lepidoscia hamalitha (Meyrick, 1893)
- Lepidoscia heliochares (Meyrick, 1893)
- Lepidoscia heliozona (Meyrick, 1893)
- Lepidoscia hemicalyptra (Lower, 1903)
- Lepidoscia herbicola Meyrick, 1921
- Lepidoscia holozona (Lower, 1903)
- Lepidoscia hyalistis (Lower, 1903)
- Lepidoscia irrorea (R. Felder & Rogenhofer, 1875)
- Lepidoscia ischnomorpha (Turner, 1923)
- Lepidoscia lainodes Meyrick, 1921
- Lepidoscia lasiocola (Meyrick, 1893)
- Lepidoscia lasiomicra (Lower, 1903)
- Lepidoscia lechriotypa (Turner, 1923)
- Lepidoscia lenceres (Turner, 1900)
- Lepidoscia leucochroa (Turner, 1923)
- Lepidoscia ligatus (Walker, 1865)
- Lepidoscia lignatrix (Meyrick, 1921)
- Lepidoscia maculifera (Lower, 1916)
- Lepidoscia magnella (Walker, 1863)
- Lepidoscia melanarthra (Meyrick, 1893)
- Lepidoscia melanogramma Lower, 1903
- Lepidoscia melanospora (Turner, 1923)
- Lepidoscia melitora Meyrick, 1893
- Lepidoscia microsticha Meyrick, 1893
- Lepidoscia microzona (Lower, 1903)
- Lepidoscia monosticha Turner, 1923
- Lepidoscia monozona (Meyrick, 1893)
- Lepidoscia muricolor Turner, 1939
- Lepidoscia myriospila (Turner, 1923)
- Lepidoscia nemorivaga (Turner, 1916)
- Lepidoscia nephelodes (Meyrick, 1893)
- Lepidoscia niphospila (Turner, 1923)
- Lepidoscia palleuca Meyrick, 1893
- Lepidoscia pelochroa (Meyrick, 1893)
- Lepidoscia phaeostola (Turner, 1923)
- Lepidoscia phaulodes (Meyrick, 1893)
- Lepidoscia photidias (Lower, 1903)
- Lepidoscia placoxantha Lower, 1903
- Lepidoscia polychrysa Lower, 1903
- Lepidoscia polymeres (Turner, 1900)
- Lepidoscia polystona (Turner, 1914)
- Lepidoscia protorna (Meyrick, 1893)
- Lepidoscia punctiferella (Walker, 1863)
- Lepidoscia pygmaea (Meyrick, 1893)
- Lepidoscia raricoma Meyrick, 1893
- Lepidoscia reticulata (Meyrick, 1893)
- Lepidoscia retinochra (Lower, 1903)
- Lepidoscia saxosa (Meyrick, 1893)
- Lepidoscia sciodesma Meyrick, 1893
- Lepidoscia scotinopis (Meyrick, 1897)
- Lepidoscia semiota (Lower, 1903)
- Lepidoscia sinuosa (Turner, 1923)
- Lepidoscia sparsa (Meyrick, 1921)
- Lepidoscia stellaris (Meyrick, 1893)
- Lepidoscia stenomochla (Turner, 1926)
- Lepidoscia stictoptera (Lower, 1920)
- Lepidoscia strepsidoma (Meyrick, 1920)
- Lepidoscia strigulata Meyrick, 1893
- Lepidoscia tetramochla (Turner, 1923)
- Lepidoscia tetraphragma Meyrick, 1921
- Lepidoscia toxoteuches (Turner, 1927)
- Lepidoscia trileuca Lower, 1903
- Lepidoscia trizona (Lower, 1903)
- Lepidoscia tyrobathra Meyrick, 1893
- Lepidoscia zonarcha (Meyrick, 1893)
- Lomera boisduvalii (Westwood, 1855)
- Metura elongatus (Saunders, 1847)
- Metura oceanica Viette, 1963
- Napecoetes belogramma (Turner, 1916)
- Napecoetes chrysomitra (Turner, 1933)
- Napecoetes crossospila Turner, 1913
- Napecoetes scoteina (Turner, 1900)
- Oecobia frauenfeldi Scott, 1864
- Paracharactis cautopsis Meyrick & Lower, 1907
- Paracharactis delocephala Meyrick & Lower, 1907
- Paracharactis erionota (Lower, 1901)
- Paracharactis leeuweni (Heylaerts, 1885)
- Phasmyalea pellucida Turner, 1947
- Piestoceros conjunctella (Walker, 1863)
- Plutorectella abdominalis (Strand, 1924)
- Psychanisa baliodes (Meyrick, 1893)
- Psychanisa guttata Walker, 1855
- Sentica felderi (Scott, 1864)
- Sentica oppositella Walker, 1863
- Trigonocyttara clandestina Turner, 1945

The following species belongs to the family Psychidae, but have not been assigned to a genus yet. Given here is the original name given to the species when it was first described:

- Oiketicus aristocosma Lower, 1908
- Oeceticus bicolor T.P. Lucas, 1894
- Plutorectis caespitosae Oke, 1948
- Plutorectis capnaea Turner, 1947
- Plutorectis crocobathra Turner, 1947
- Oiketicus dewitzi Heylaerts, 1885
- Plutorectis dysmorpha Turner, 1947
- Oeceticus felinus T.P. Lucas, 1900
- Plutorectis fulva Turner, 1947
- Chalia grisea Heylaerts, 1885
- Oiketecis gymnophasa Lower, 1900
- Clania hemitricha Meyrick & Lower, 1907
- Hyaloptila hyalosoma Turner, 1947
- Chalia lurida Heylaerts, 1885
- Plutorectis melanodes Meyrick & Lower, 1907
- Plutorectis mjobergi Aurivillius, 1920
- Mesopherna niphopasta Turner, 1923
- Plutorectis pantosemna Turner, 1931
- Plutorectis paura Turner, 1947
- Plutorectis pelloceros Turner, 1932
- Clania persimilis Turner, 1947
- Clania photidias Meyrick & Lower, 1907
- Clania sciogramma Turner, 1914
- Plutorectis thermacula Lower, 1908
- Oiketicus walkeriana Betrem, 1951
- Plutorectis xanthochrysa Meyrick & Lower, 1907
- Plutorectis zophopepla Meyrick & Lower, 1907
