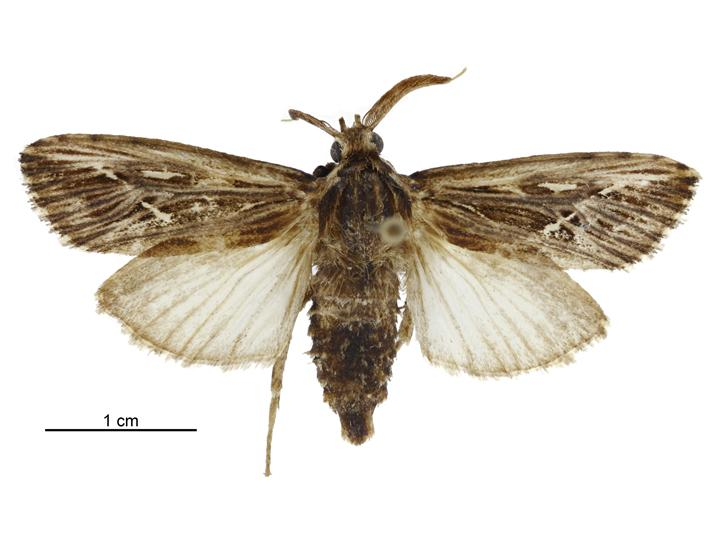

Scientific classification
- Domain: Eukaryota
- Kingdom: Animalia
- Phylum: Arthropoda
- Class: Insecta
- Order: Lepidoptera
- Family: Cossidae
- Genus: Acritocera
- Species: A. negligens

Binomial name
- Acritocera negligens Butler, 1886

= Acritocera negligens =

Species of moth

Acritocera negligens, the coconut spathe borer, is a moth of the family Cossidae. It is found on Fiji.
