= Dolecta scariosa =

Scientific classification
- Kingdom: Animalia
- Phylum: Arthropoda
- Class: Insecta
- Order: Lepidoptera
- Family: Cossidae
- Genus: Dolecta
- Species: D. scariosa

Binomial name
- Dolecta scariosa Herrich-Schäffer, 1854

Species of moth

Dolecta scariosa is a moth in the family Cossidae. It is found in Brazil.
