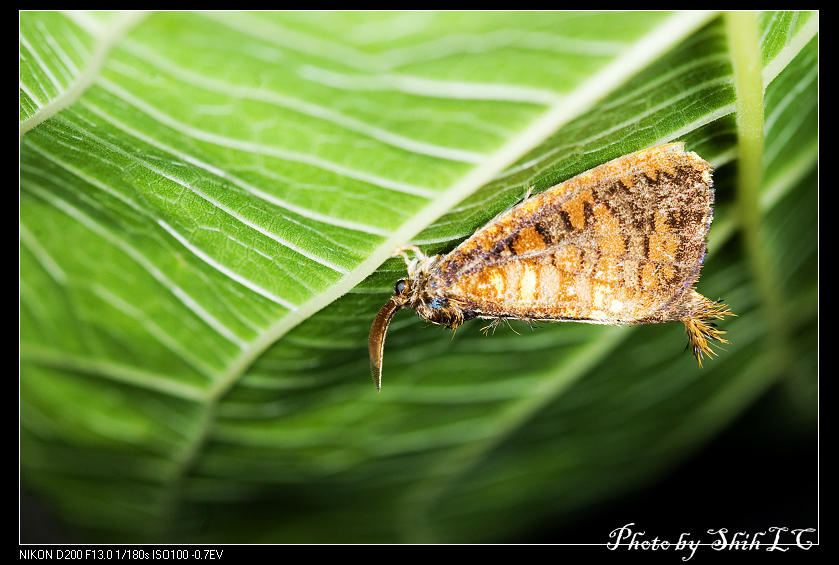

Scientific classification
- Domain: Eukaryota
- Kingdom: Animalia
- Phylum: Arthropoda
- Class: Insecta
- Order: Lepidoptera
- Family: Cossidae
- Genus: Ratarda
- Species: R. excellens

Binomial name
- Ratarda excellens (Strand, 1917)

Synonyms
- Shisa excellens Strand, 1917; Arbela formosana Matsumura, 1921; Ratarda formosana; Ratarda tertia Strand, 1917; Ratarda tertia ab. monstrosa Strand, 1917

= Ratarda excellens =

Species of moth

Ratarda excellens is a moth in the family Cossidae. It is found in Taiwan.

The length of the forewings is about 16 mm for males and 22 mm for females.
