= Ratarda guttifera =

Scientific classification
- Domain: Eukaryota
- Kingdom: Animalia
- Phylum: Arthropoda
- Class: Insecta
- Order: Lepidoptera
- Family: Cossidae
- Genus: Ratarda
- Species: R. guttifera

Binomial name
- Ratarda guttifera Hering, 1925

Species of moth

Ratarda guttifera is a moth in the family Cossidae. It is found in the Himalayas.
