= Ratarda mora =

Scientific classification
- Domain: Eukaryota
- Kingdom: Animalia
- Phylum: Arthropoda
- Class: Insecta
- Order: Lepidoptera
- Family: Cossidae
- Genus: Ratarda
- Species: R. mora

Binomial name
- Ratarda mora Hering, 1925

Species of moth

Ratarda mora is a moth in the family Cossidae. It is found on the island of Labuan.

Adults are black with circular white spots on the forewings.
