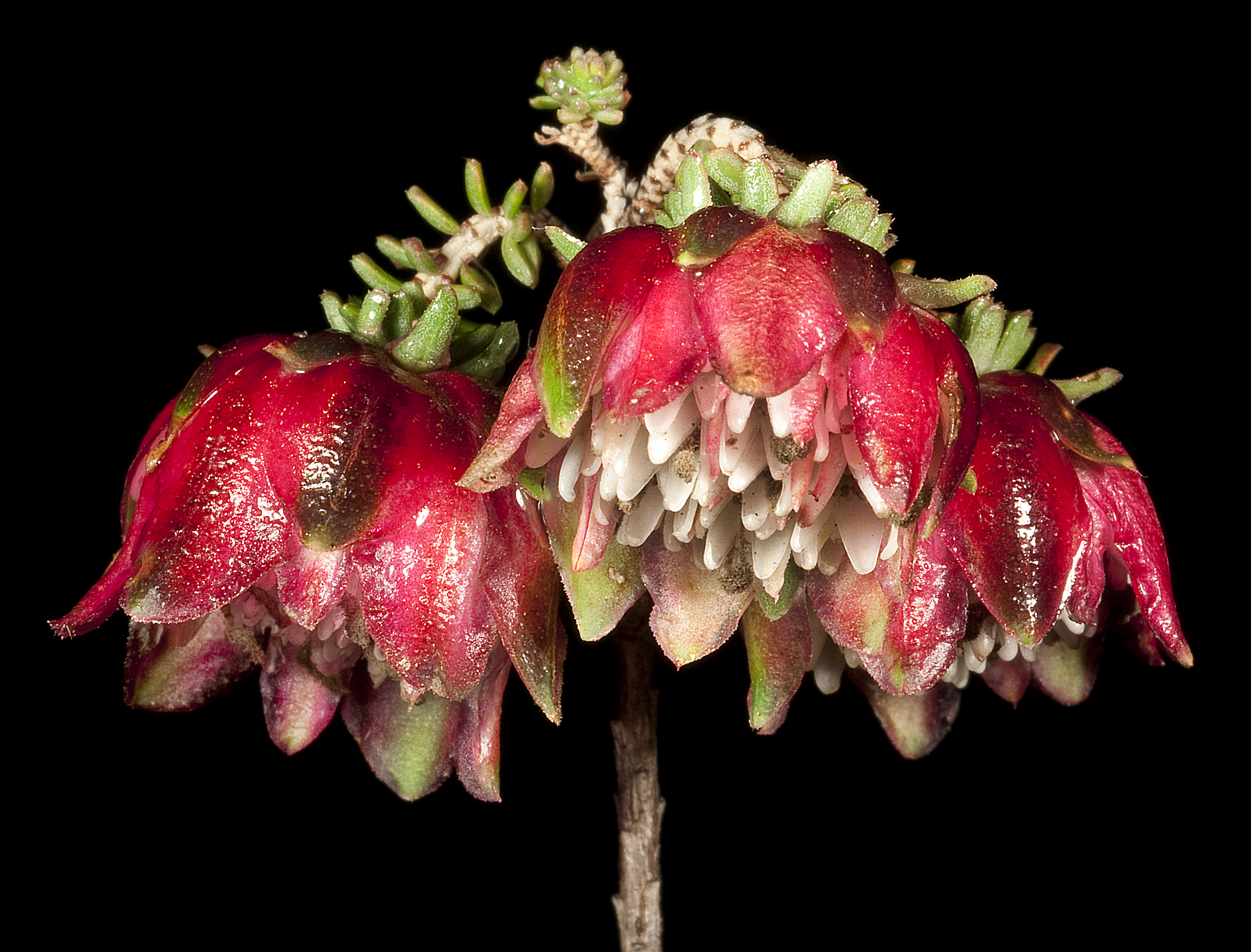
- Darwinia polychroma

Conservation status
- Endangered (EPBC Act)

Scientific classification
- Kingdom: Plantae
- Clade: Tracheophytes
- Clade: Angiosperms
- Clade: Eudicots
- Clade: Rosids
- Order: Myrtales
- Family: Myrtaceae
- Genus: Darwinia
- Species: D. polychroma

Binomial name
- Darwinia polychroma Keighery
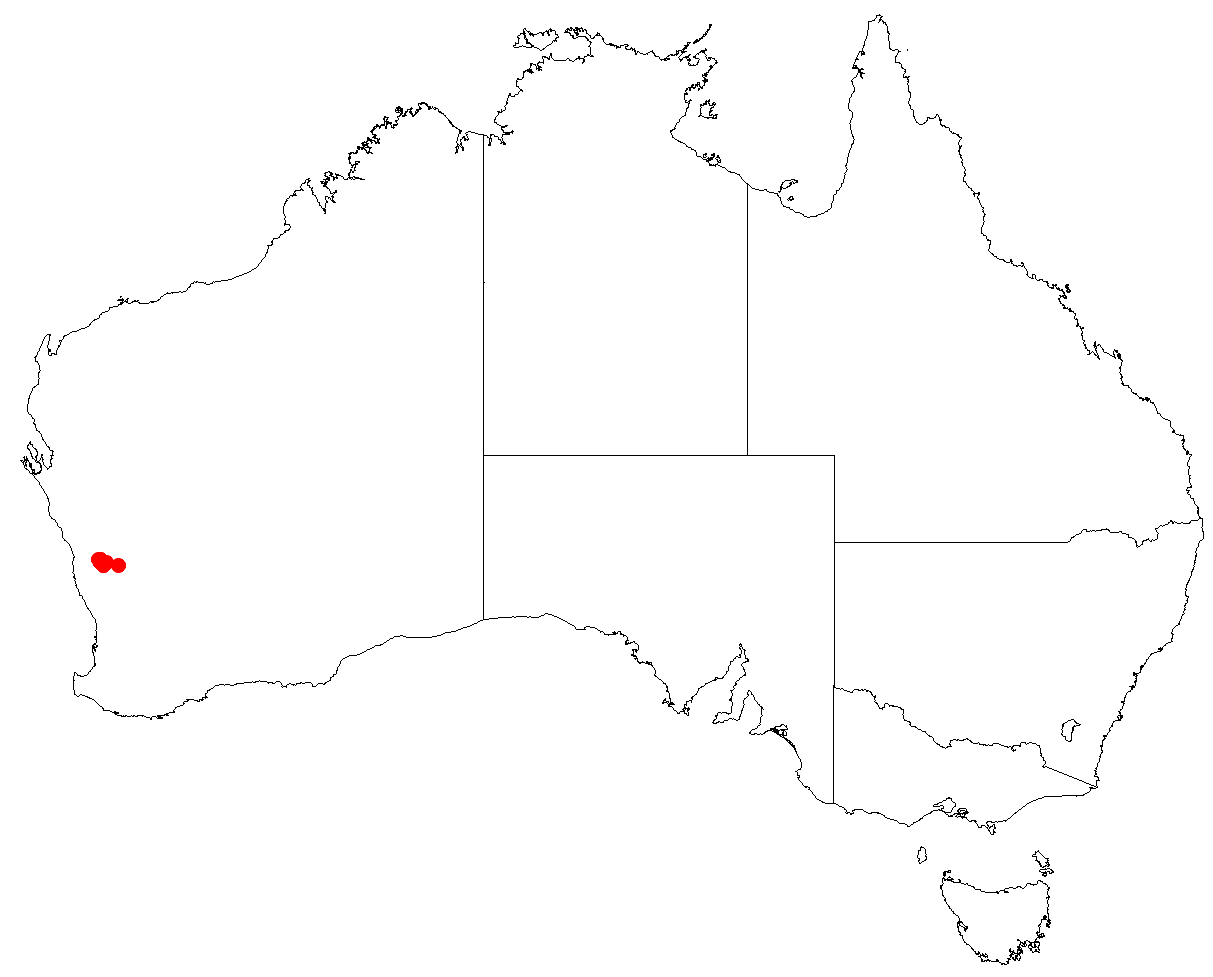
- Collections data from AVH

= Darwinia polychroma =

Species of flowering plant

Darwinia polychroma, commonly known as harlequin bell, is a species of flowering plant in the myrtle family Myrtaceae and is endemic to Western Australia. It has linear leaves and drooping flowers surrounded by yellowish green, green and red bracts.

== Description ==
Darwinia polychroma is a spreading shrub up to 1.2 m (3 ft 11 in) high and 1.5 m (4 ft 11 in) wide when mature, with many old, grey, leafless woody stems on the ground, but is an erect shrub when young. The leaves are densely crowded on the ends of branches, and are linear, triangular in cross-section, 2–4 mm (0.079–0.157 in) long and 1 mm (0.039 in) wide on a petiole about 0.5 mm (0.020 in) long. The flowers are arranged in drooping groups surrounded by several overlapping rows of yellowish green, green and red bracts 10–12 mm (0.39–0.47 in) long. Each flower has two boat-shaped to egg-shaped bracteoles at the base. The floral tube is yellowish green, about 3 mm (0.12 in) long, the sepal lobes about 1 mm (0.039 in) long, the petals 2–3 mm (0.079–0.118 in) long and there are 10 stamens and 10 staminodes. Flowering mainly occurs from July to September.

== Taxonomy ==
Darwinia polychroma was first formally described in 2009 by Gregory John Keighery in the journal Nuytsia from specimens collected near Carnamah in 1995. The specific epithet (polychroma) means "many-colours", referring to the involucral bracts.

== Distribution and habitat ==
Harlequin bell grows in shrubland, and is confined to a few road and rail verges in the Carnamah area, in a range of about 10 kilometres (6 mi), although prior to 1929 it had a wider distribution. It is found amongst open low scrub or shrubland with Melaleuca species, Acacia ligulata, mallee (Eucalyptus species) and Exocarpos species growing in yellow loamy sand over laterite. Three populations occur on road or railway reserves, over a range of approximately 10 km (6.2 mi), with one on private property. The total populations is less than 200 plants.

== Conservation status ==
This darwinia is listed as "endangered" under the Australian Government Environment Protection and Biodiversity Conservation Act 1999 and as "threatened" by the Western Australian Government Department of Biodiversity, Conservation and Attractions, meaning that it is in danger of extinction.
