= Ratarda javanica =

Scientific classification
- Domain: Eukaryota
- Kingdom: Animalia
- Phylum: Arthropoda
- Class: Insecta
- Order: Lepidoptera
- Family: Cossidae
- Genus: Ratarda
- Species: R. javanica

Binomial name
- Ratarda javanica Roepke, 1937

Species of moth

Ratarda javanica is a moth in the family Cossidae. It is found on Java.
