= Ratarda marmorata =

Scientific classification
- Domain: Eukaryota
- Kingdom: Animalia
- Phylum: Arthropoda
- Class: Insecta
- Order: Lepidoptera
- Family: Cossidae
- Genus: Ratarda
- Species: R. marmorata

Binomial name
- Ratarda marmorata Moore, 1879

Species of moth

Ratarda marmorata is a moth in the family Cossidae. It is found in Himalayas.
