= Callosiope =

Scientific classification
- Kingdom: Animalia
- Phylum: Arthropoda
- Class: Insecta
- Order: Lepidoptera
- Family: Cossidae
- Subfamily: Ratardinae
- Genus: Callosiope; Hering, 1925
- Species: C. banghaasi

Binomial name
- Callosiope banghaasi Hering, 1925

Species of moth

Callosiope banghaasi is a moth in the family Cossidae, and the only species in the genus Callosiope. It is found on Peninsular Malaysia and Sumatra.
