= Pseudocossus boisduvalii =

Scientific classification
- Kingdom: Animalia
- Phylum: Arthropoda
- Class: Insecta
- Order: Lepidoptera
- Family: Cossidae
- Genus: Pseudocossus
- Species: P. boisduvalii

Binomial name
- Pseudocossus boisduvalii Viette, 1955

Species of moth

Pseudocossus boisduvalii is a moth in the family Cossidae. It was described by Viette in 1955. It is found in Madagascar.
