= Pseudocossus viettei =

Scientific classification
- Kingdom: Animalia
- Phylum: Arthropoda
- Clade: Pancrustacea
- Class: Insecta
- Order: Lepidoptera
- Family: Cossidae
- Genus: Pseudocossus
- Species: P. viettei

Binomial name
- Pseudocossus viettei Yakovlev, 2011

Species of moth

Pseudocossus viettei is a moth in the family Cossidae. It was described by Yakovlev in 2011. It is found in Madagascar.
