= Pseudocossus uliginosus =

Scientific classification
- Domain: Eukaryota
- Kingdom: Animalia
- Phylum: Arthropoda
- Class: Insecta
- Order: Lepidoptera
- Family: Cossidae
- Genus: Pseudocossus
- Species: P. uliginosus

Binomial name
- Pseudocossus uliginosus Kenrick, 1914

Species of moth

Pseudocossus uliginosus is a moth in the family Cossidae. It was described by George Hamilton Kenrick in 1914. It is found on Madagascar.
