= Pseudocossus mineti =

Scientific classification
- Kingdom: Animalia
- Phylum: Arthropoda
- Clade: Pancrustacea
- Class: Insecta
- Order: Lepidoptera
- Family: Cossidae
- Genus: Pseudocossus
- Species: P. mineti

Binomial name
- Pseudocossus mineti Yakovlev, 2011

Species of moth

Pseudocossus mineti is a moth in the family Cossidae. It was described by Yakovlev in 2011. It is found in Madagascar.
