= Pseudocossus =

Scientific classification
- Domain: Eukaryota
- Kingdom: Animalia
- Phylum: Arthropoda
- Class: Insecta
- Order: Lepidoptera
- Family: Cossidae
- Subfamily: Pseudocossinae
- Genus: Pseudocossus; Kenrick, 1914

Moth genus in family Cossidae

Pseudocossus is a genus of moths of the family Cossidae from Madagascar.

Type species: Pseudocossus uliginosus Kenrick, 1914

== Species ==
- Pseudocossus boisduvalii Viette, 1955
- Pseudocossus mineti Yakovlev, 2011
- Pseudocossus olsoufieffae Yakovlev, 2011
- Pseudocossus pljustchi Yakovlev & Saldaitis, 2011
- Pseudocossus uliginosus Kenrick, 1914
- Pseudocossus viettei Yakovlev, 2011
