= Pseudocossus olsoufieffae =

Scientific classification
- Kingdom: Animalia
- Phylum: Arthropoda
- Clade: Pancrustacea
- Class: Insecta
- Order: Lepidoptera
- Family: Cossidae
- Genus: Pseudocossus
- Species: P. olsoufieffae

Binomial name
- Pseudocossus olsoufieffae Yakovlev, 2011

Species of moth

Pseudocossus olsoufieffae is a moth in the family Cossidae. It was described by Yakovlev in 2011. It is found in Madagascar.
