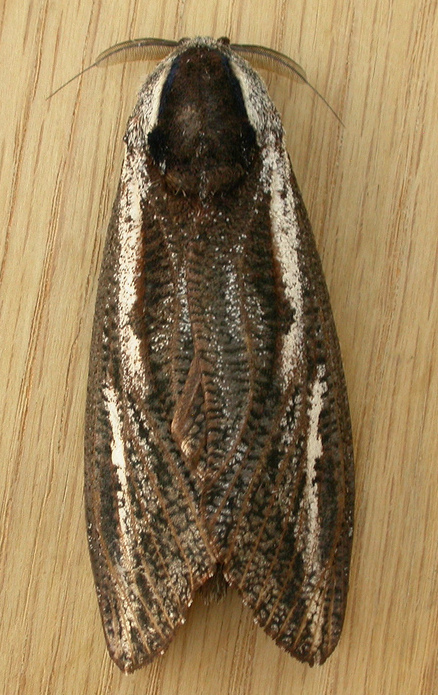

Scientific classification
- Kingdom: Animalia
- Phylum: Arthropoda
- Clade: Pancrustacea
- Class: Insecta
- Order: Lepidoptera
- Family: Cossidae
- Genus: Endoxyla
- Species: E. leucomochla

Binomial name
- Endoxyla leucomochla (Turner, 1915)

Synonyms
- Xyleutes leucomochla Turner, 1915

= Endoxyla leucomochla =

Species of moth

Endoxyla leucomochla is a species of cossid moth endemic to Australia. The larva of the moth is commonly known as the "witchetty grub", and is widely used as bush tucker by Indigenous Australians.

The caterpillars of the species live in tunnels where they feed on the sap from the roots of the witchetty bush (Acacia kempeana) and the small cooba (Acacia ligulata). The caterpillar grows to a length of about 7 cm, and pupates underground inside its tunnel.

The adult moth is large (it has a wingspan of about 16 cm), with a fine mottled grey pattern and rusty red base on its wings. The moth has degenerate mouthparts, and is unable to feed itself, relying solely on nourishment obtained during its larval phase.

Gallery

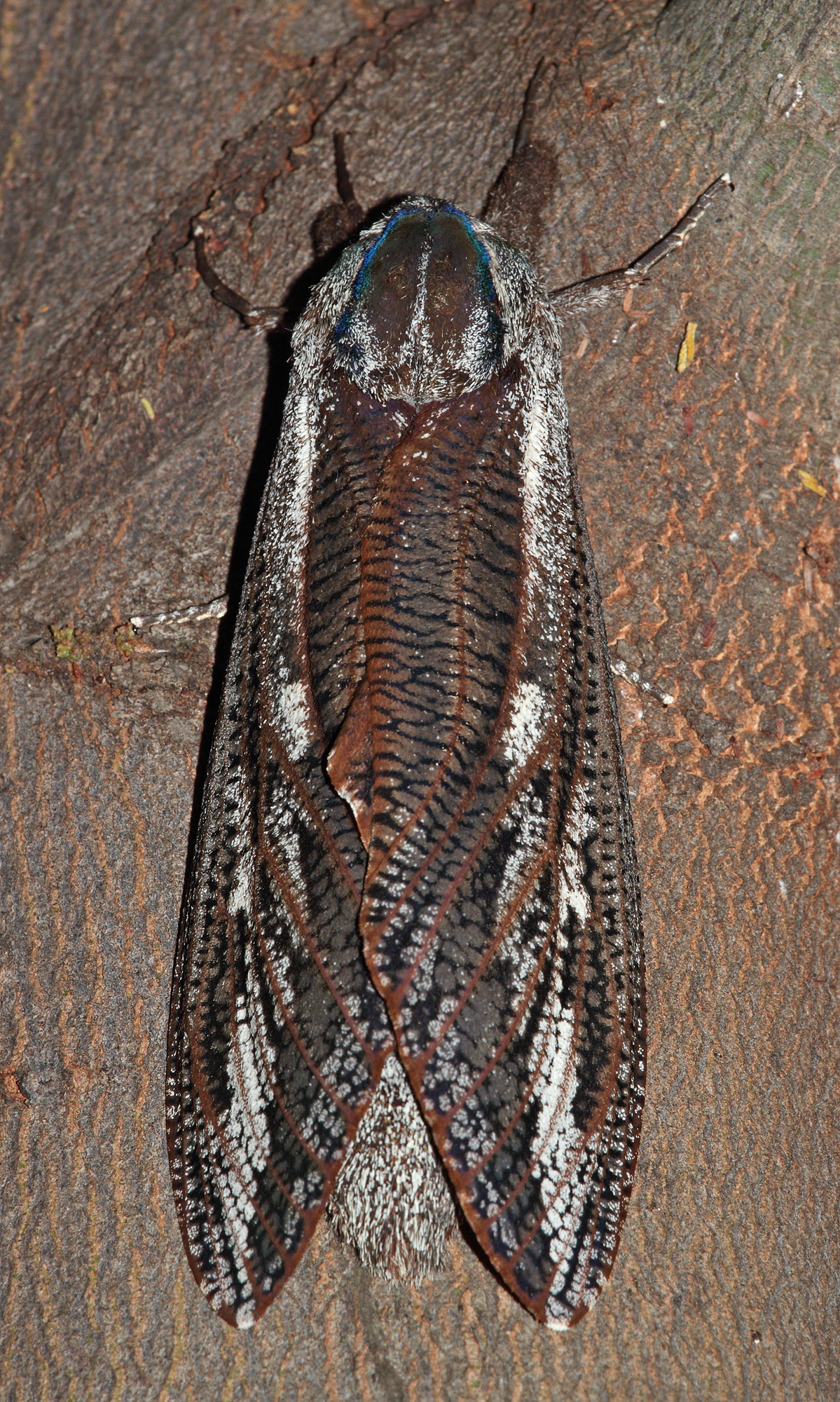

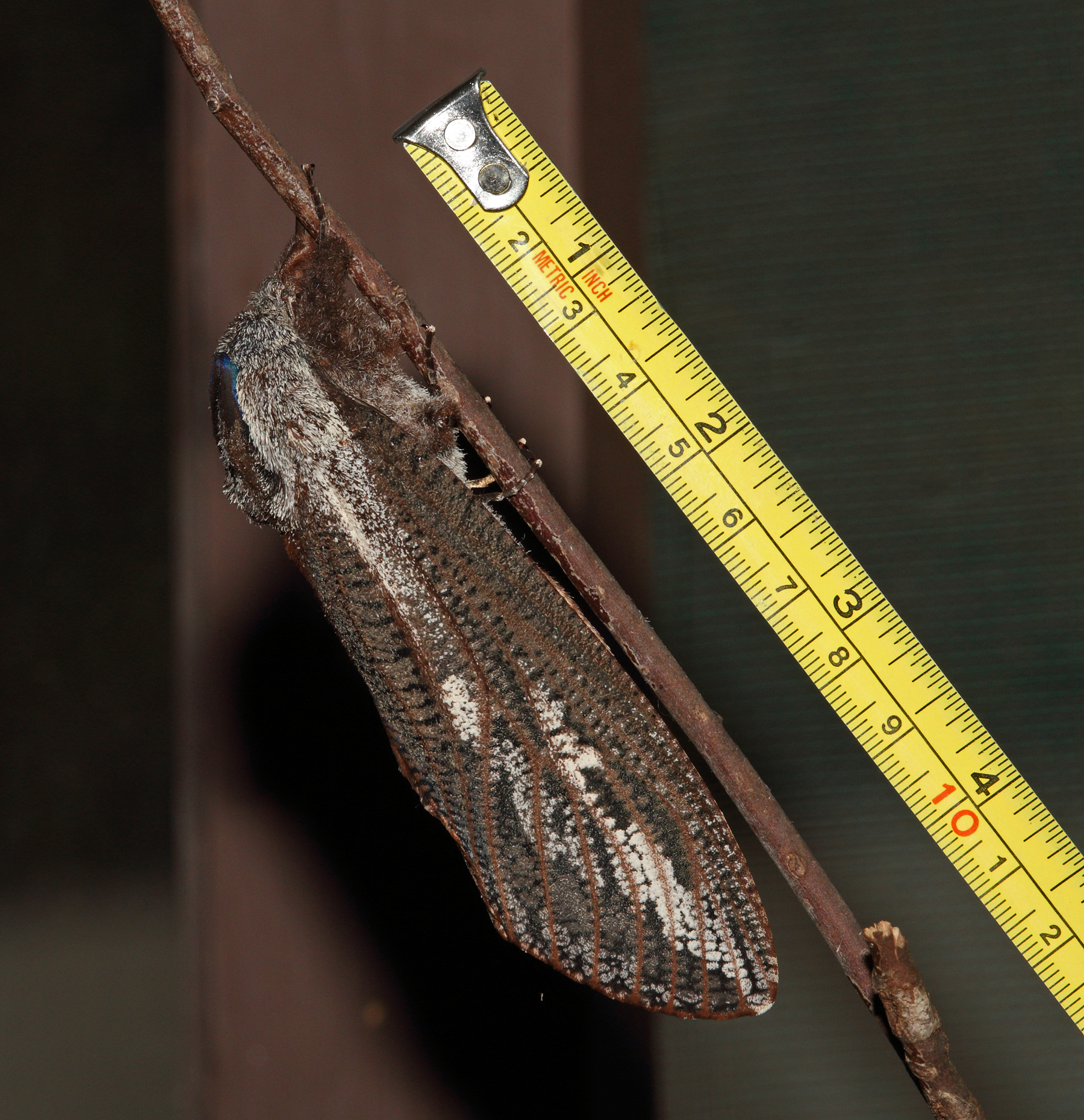

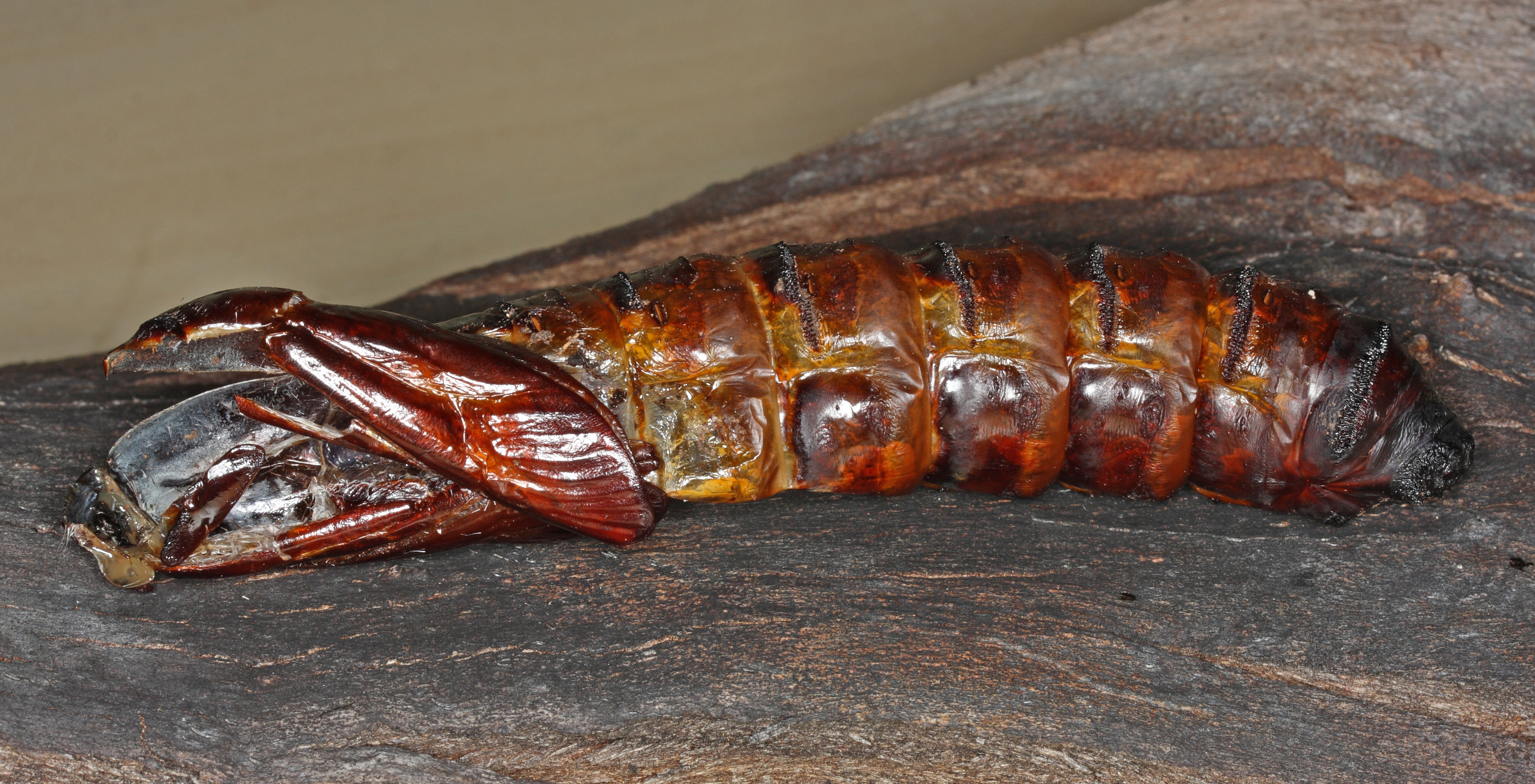

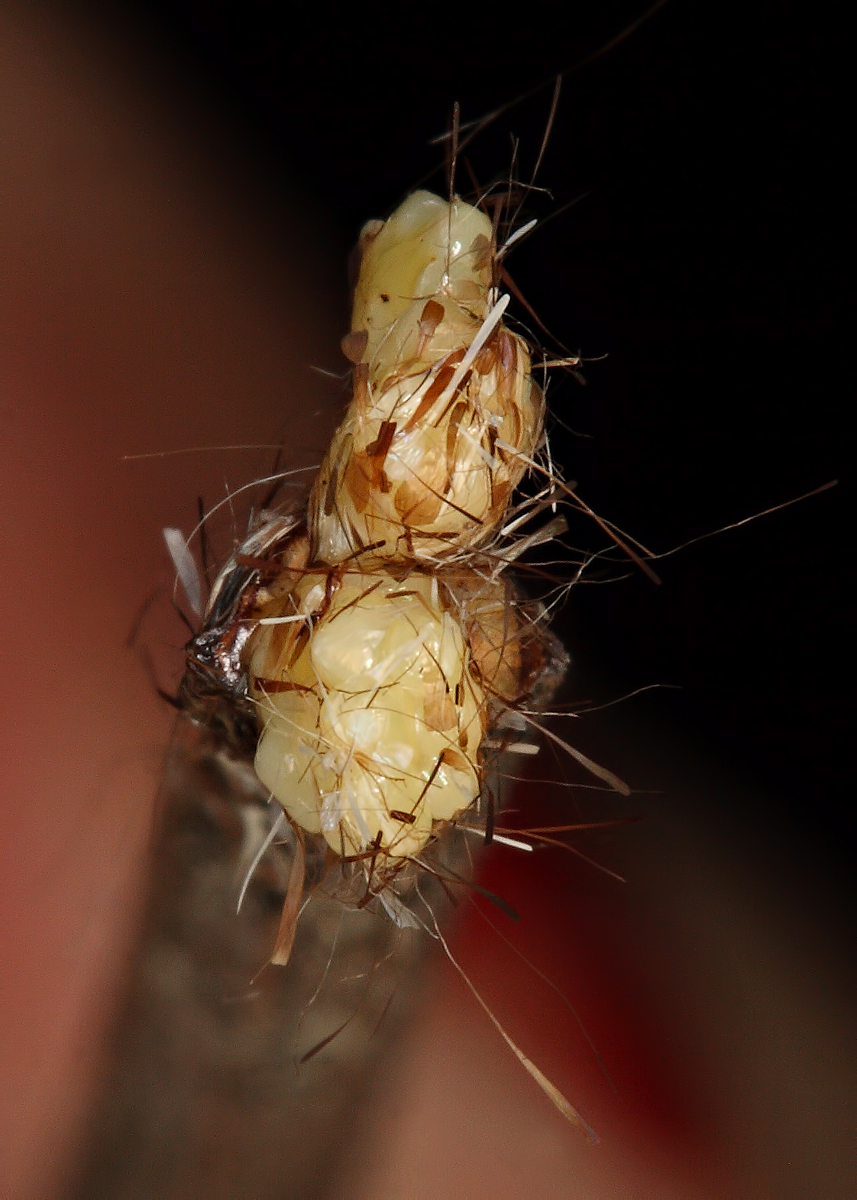
