= Ratarda melanoxantha =

Scientific classification
- Domain: Eukaryota
- Kingdom: Animalia
- Phylum: Arthropoda
- Class: Insecta
- Order: Lepidoptera
- Family: Cossidae
- Genus: Ratarda
- Species: R. melanoxantha

Binomial name
- Ratarda melanoxantha Hering, 1925

Species of moth

Ratarda melanoxantha is a moth in the family Cossidae. It is found on Borneo.

Adults have mottled yellow wings with a basal black area on the forewings. This black area occupies half of the wing on the hindwings.
