= Politzariella =

Scientific classification
- Kingdom: Animalia
- Phylum: Arthropoda
- Clade: Pancrustacea
- Class: Insecta
- Order: Lepidoptera
- Family: Cossidae
- Subfamily: Politzariellinae
- Genus: Politzariella; Yakovlev, 2011
- Species: P. pantherina

Binomial name
- Politzariella pantherina Yakovlev, 2011

Monotypic moth genus in family Cossidae

Politzariella is a genus of moths in the family Cossidae. It contains only one species, Politzariella pantherina, which is found in Burkina Faso.
