= Sumatratarda =

Scientific classification
- Kingdom: Animalia
- Phylum: Arthropoda
- Class: Insecta
- Order: Lepidoptera
- Family: Cossidae
- Subfamily: Ratardinae
- Genus: Sumatratarda; Kobes & Ronkay, 1990
- Species: S. diehlii

Binomial name
- Sumatratarda diehlii Kobes & Ronkay, 1990

Species of moth

Sumatratarda diehlii is a moth in the family Cossidae, and the only species in the genus Sumatratarda. It is found on Sumatra.
