= Dolecta invenusta =

Scientific classification
- Kingdom: Animalia
- Phylum: Arthropoda
- Class: Insecta
- Order: Lepidoptera
- Family: Cossidae
- Genus: Dolecta
- Species: D. invenusta

Binomial name
- Dolecta invenusta Schaus, 1892

Species of moth

Dolecta invenusta is a moth in the family Cossidae. It is found in Brazil.
