= Dolecta juturna =

Scientific classification
- Kingdom: Animalia
- Phylum: Arthropoda
- Class: Insecta
- Order: Lepidoptera
- Family: Cossidae
- Genus: Dolecta
- Species: D. juturna

Binomial name
- Dolecta juturna Schaus, 1892

Species of moth

Dolecta juturna is a moth in the family Cossidae. It is found in Brazil.

https://animaldiversity.org/accounts/Dolecta_juturna/classification/
