= Geraldocossus =

Scientific classification
- Kingdom: Animalia
- Phylum: Arthropoda
- Clade: Pancrustacea
- Class: Insecta
- Order: Lepidoptera
- Family: Cossidae
- Genus: Geraldocossus; Yakovlev & Sáfián, 2016
- Species: G. durrelli

Binomial name
- Geraldocossus durrelli Yakovlev & Sáfián, 2016

Monotypic moth genus in subfamily Polizariellinae

Geraldocossus is a monotypic genus of moths in the Politzariellinae subfamily of the carpenter miller moths. Its sole species, Geraldocossus durrelli, is found in Cameroon. It is solely known from two male specimens.

== Description ==
Geraldocossus durrelli is of medium size, with a forewing length of 15 mm. Its short and wide forewings are darkly coloured with a faint pattern and have rounded apices and mottled black and brown fringes. The hindwings are an unpatterned dark grey with a uniformly grey fringe. The underside of the forewings is black, that of the hindwings is grey; both hold no patterns. The thorax and abdomen are covered with dark scales, brown in case of the thorax and black on the abdomen. Antennae are simple.

G. durrelli can be distinguished from other species in the Politzariellinae subfamily based on male genitalia, from which it differs by the presence of needle-like spines at the apices of the gnathos branches and by the complicated juxta-structure which includes three pairs of lateral processes.

== Distribution ==
G. durrelli is known solely from Mount Cameroon, where both known specimens were collected on the south-western slope at an altitude of 1100 m above sea level, in the submontane zone.

== Etymology ==
Both the generic and specific name are in honour of Gerald Durrell.
