= Dolecta macrochir =

Scientific classification
- Kingdom: Animalia
- Phylum: Arthropoda
- Class: Insecta
- Order: Lepidoptera
- Family: Cossidae
- Genus: Dolecta
- Species: D. macrochir

Binomial name
- Dolecta macrochir Schaus, 1892

Species of moth

Dolecta macrochir is a moth in the family Cossidae. It is found in Brazil.
