= Ratarda flavimargo =

Scientific classification
- Domain: Eukaryota
- Kingdom: Animalia
- Phylum: Arthropoda
- Class: Insecta
- Order: Lepidoptera
- Family: Cossidae
- Genus: Ratarda
- Species: R. flavimargo

Binomial name
- Ratarda flavimargo Hering, 1925

Species of moth

Ratarda flavimargo is a moth in the family Cossidae. It is found on Labuan and in Brunei.

Adults have pinkish grey wings with black markings between the veins which grade to yellow.
