= Ratarda furvivestita =

Scientific classification
- Kingdom: Animalia
- Phylum: Arthropoda
- Class: Insecta
- Order: Lepidoptera
- Family: Cossidae
- Genus: Ratarda
- Species: R. furvivestita

Binomial name
- Ratarda furvivestita Hampson, 1905

Species of moth

Ratarda furvivestita is a moth in the family Cossidae. It is found in the Himalayas.
