= Ptilomacra senex =

Scientific classification
- Kingdom: Animalia
- Phylum: Arthropoda
- Class: Insecta
- Order: Lepidoptera
- Family: Cossidae
- Genus: Ptilomacra
- Species: P. senex

Binomial name
- Ptilomacra senex Walker, 1855

Species of moth

Ptilomacra senex is a species of carpenter moth in the family Cossidae. They are commonly called "Wood Moths". They are found in the southeast quarter of mainland Australia, such as in Queensland, New South Wales, Victoria, and South Australia. Adult moths have a light and dark fawn pattern on their wings, and they have a wingspan of approximately 10 cm.
