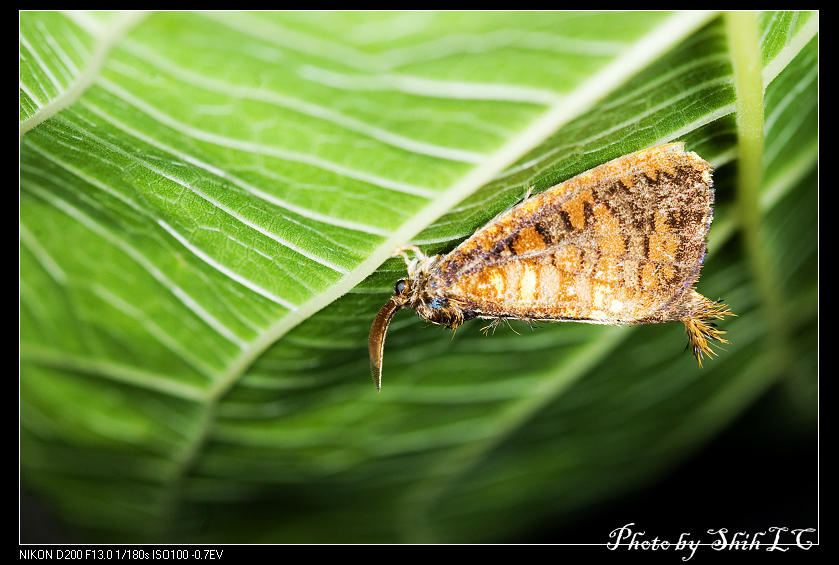
- Ratarda excellens

Scientific classification
- Domain: Eukaryota
- Kingdom: Animalia
- Phylum: Arthropoda
- Class: Insecta
- Order: Lepidoptera
- Family: Cossidae
- Subfamily: Ratardinae
- Genus: Ratarda; Moore, 1879

Synonyms
- Shisa Strand, 1917

= Ratarda =

Genus of moths

Ratarda is a genus of moths in the family Cossidae.

== Species ==
- Ratarda excellens (Strand, 1917) (originally in Shisa)
- Ratarda flavimargo Hering, 1925
- Ratarda furvivestita Hampson
- Ratarda guttifera Hering, 1925
- Ratarda javanica Roepke, 1937
- Ratarda marmorata Moore, 1879
- Ratarda melanoxantha Hering, 1925
- Ratarda mora Hering, 1925
