= Ptilomacra =

Scientific classification
- Kingdom: Animalia
- Phylum: Arthropoda
- Class: Insecta
- Order: Lepidoptera
- Family: Cossidae
- Genus: Ptilomacra; Walker, 1855

Synonyms
- Pachyphlebius Felder, 1874

Moth genus in family Cossidae

zetsu is a genus of moths in the family Cossidae.

== Species ==
- Ptilomacra senex Walker, 1855
