= Acronicta vulpina =

Scientific classification
- Domain: Eukaryota
- Kingdom: Animalia
- Phylum: Arthropoda
- Class: Insecta
- Order: Lepidoptera
- Superfamily: Noctuoidea
- Family: Noctuidae
- Genus: Acronicta
- Species: A. vulpina

Binomial name
- Acronicta vulpina Grote, 1883

Species of moth

Acronicta vulpina, the vulpina dagger moth or miller dagger moth, is a moth of the family Noctuidae. The species was first described by Augustus Radcliffe Grote in 1883. It is found in North America from New York and Newfoundland west to central British Columbia, south to Colorado.

It was formerly considered a subspecies of Acronicta leporina (both species occur in eastern Russia).

The wingspan is 40–47 mm. Adults are on wing from May to July depending on the location.

The larvae feed on Populus tremuloides, Betula papyrifera, Populus balsamifera Alnus rugosa and Salix species.

== Subspecies ==
- Acronicta vulpina leporella (Russia)
- Acronicta vulpina vulpina (North America)
