= Witchetty grub =

Common name for a moth larva

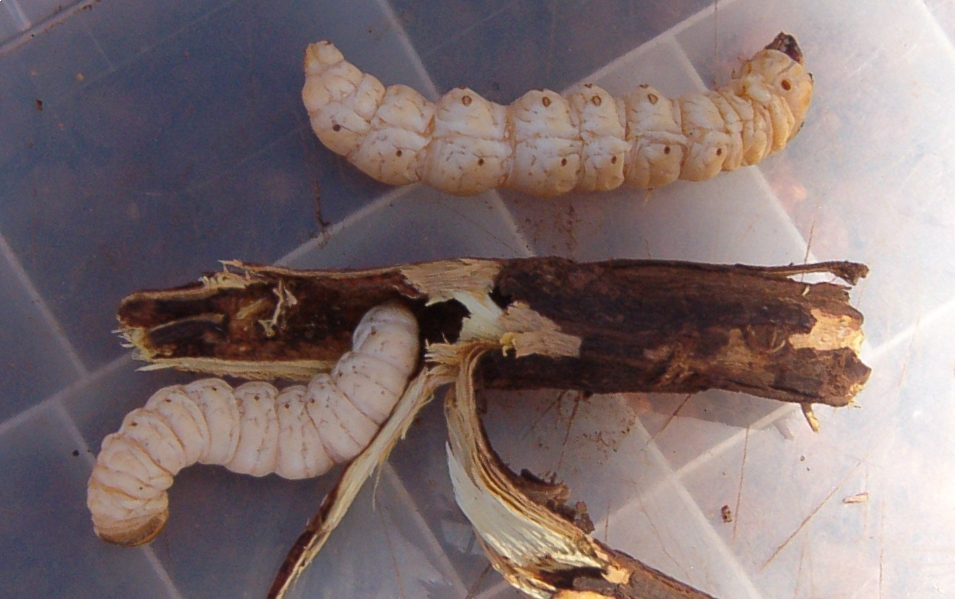
Witchetty grubs (Endoxyla leucomochla)

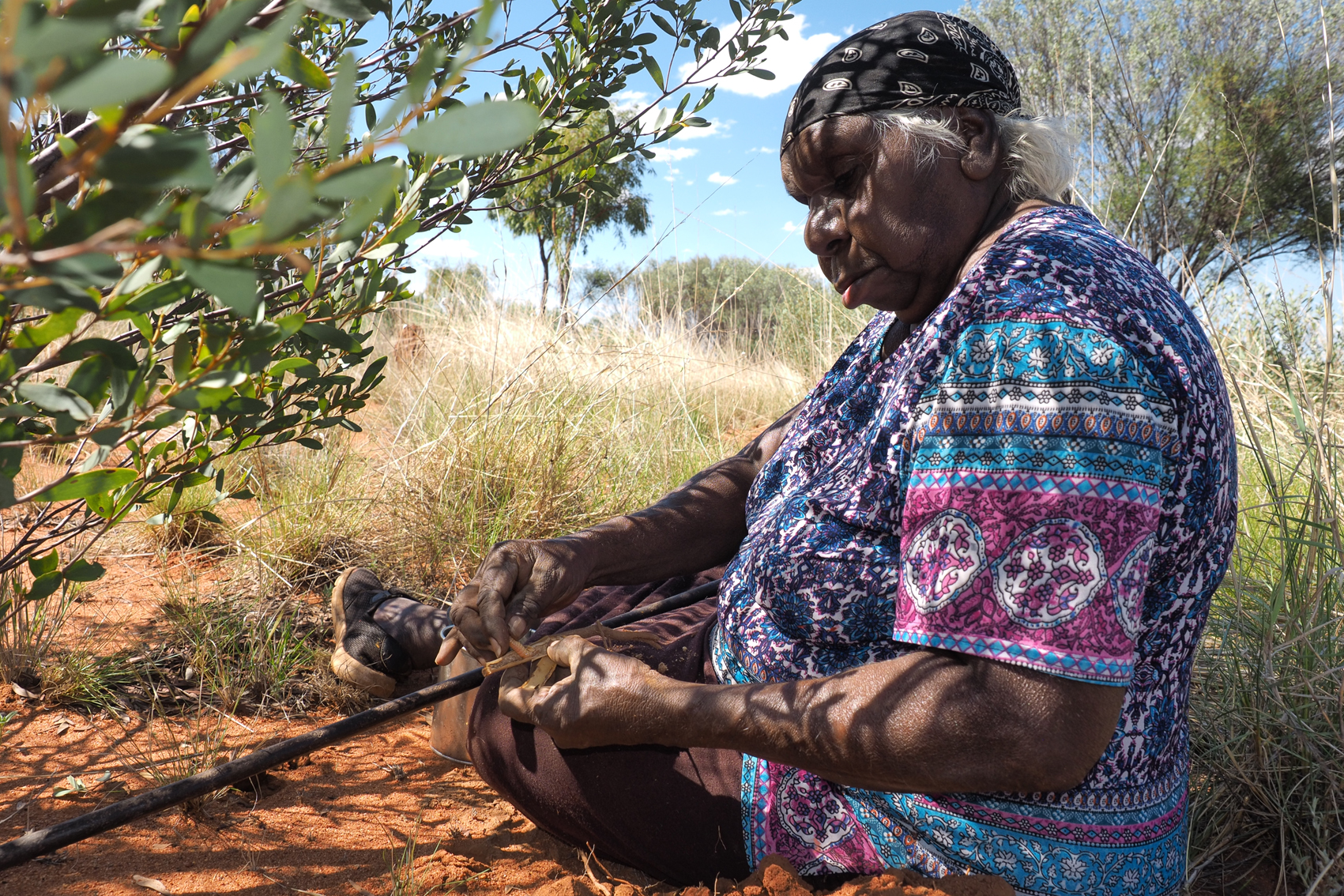
A woman hunting for witchetty grubs near Yuendumu, Northern Territory.

The witchetty grub (also spelled witchety grub or witjuti grub) is a term used in Australia for the large, white, wood-eating larvae of several moths. In particular, it applies to the larvae of the cossid moth Endoxyla leucomochla, which feeds on the roots of the witchetty bush (after which the grubs are named) that is widespread throughout the Northern Territory and also typically found in parts of Western Australia and South Australia, although it is also found elsewhere throughout Australia.

The term can also apply to larvae of other cossid moths, ghost moths (Hepialidae), and longhorn beetles (Cerambycidae). The term is used mainly when the larvae are being considered as food. The grub is the most important insect food of the desert and has historically been a staple in the diets of Aboriginal Australians.

== Terminology ==
The Arabana term for the grub is mako witjuti (with emphasis on initial syllables); mako means grub, and witjuti refers to the shrub, not the grub itself. Similarly, Ngalea peoples called the insect mako wardaruka, meaning grubs of the wardaruka (Acacia ligulata) shrub. The Pitjantjatjara name is maku. It has been suggested that the word "witchetty" comes from the Adynyamathanha word wityu, meaning "hooked stick", and vartu, meaning "grub".

== Description ==
The different larvae are said to taste similar. Edible either raw or lightly cooked in hot ashes, they are sought as a high-protein food by Aboriginal Australians. The raw witchetty grub tastes similar to almonds; however, when cooked, the skin becomes crisp like roast chicken, while the inside becomes light yellow, like a fried egg, and the taste has been anecdotally described variously as like scrambled egg, chicken, or a "prawn with peanut sauce".

These grubs live in trees. They can also be found in black wattle trees, and are considered to be the reason why wattles die within 10 to 15 years. The roots of the Acacia kempeana shrub are another source of the grubs. When held, as a defence mechanism, the grubs will secrete a brown liquid.

== Cultural significance ==
Witchetty grubs feature as Dreamings in many Aboriginal paintings. Witchetty grubs have also been imitated in confectionary and were a common Australian lolly.

== See also ==
- Bush tucker
- Huhu beetle
