= Pseudocossinae =

Scientific classification
- Kingdom: Animalia
- Phylum: Arthropoda
- Clade: Pancrustacea
- Class: Insecta
- Order: Lepidoptera
- Family: Cossidae
- Subfamily: Pseudocossinae; Heppner, 1984

Subfamily of moths

The Pseudocossinae are a subfamily of the family Cossidae (carpenter or goat moths).

== Genera ==
- Pseudocossus Kenrick, [1914]
