= Degia imparata =

Scientific classification
- Domain: Eukaryota
- Kingdom: Animalia
- Phylum: Arthropoda
- Class: Insecta
- Order: Lepidoptera
- Family: Psychidae
- Subfamily: Typhoniinae
- Tribe: Penestoglossini
- Genus: Degia
- Species: D. imparata

Binomial name
- Degia imparata Walker, 1862

Synonyms
- Eusceletaula immodica Meyrick, 1936; Degia immodica; Cossus lepta West, 1932; Degia lepta

Species of moth

Degia imparata is a moth in the Psychidae family. It is found in China (Yunnan), Vietnam, Thailand, Malaysia, Borneo, the Philippines and Sumatra.
