= Napecoetes =

Scientific classification
- Kingdom: Animalia
- Phylum: Arthropoda
- Class: Insecta
- Order: Lepidoptera
- Family: Psychidae
- Genus: Napecoetes; Turner, 1913

Synonyms
- Phaulophara Turner, 1916; Dinocrana Turner, 1933

Genus of moths

Napecoetes is a genus of moths in the family Psychidae.

== Species ==
- Napecoetes belogramma (Turner, 1916)
- Napecoetes crossospila (Turner, 1923)
- Napecoetes chrysomitra (Turner, 1933)
- Napecoetes scoteina (Turner, 1900)
