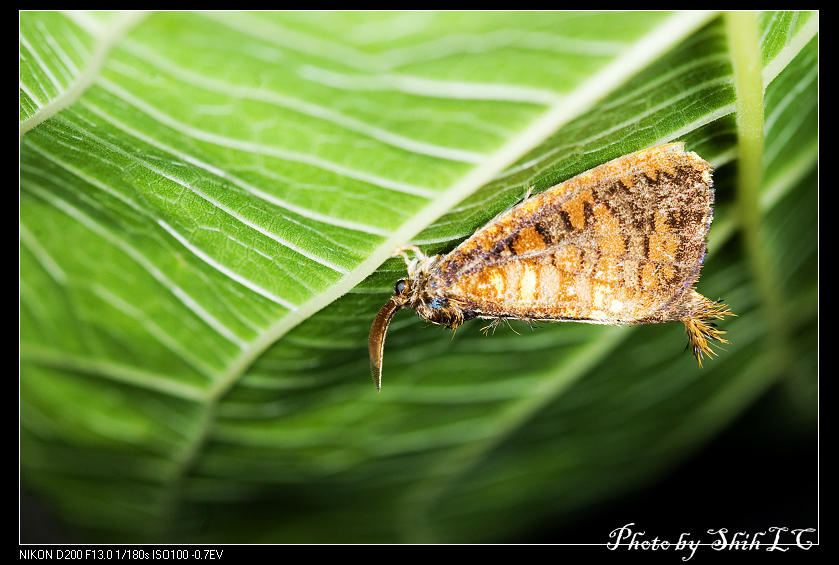
- Ratarda excellens

Scientific classification
- Kingdom: Animalia
- Phylum: Arthropoda
- Class: Insecta
- Order: Lepidoptera
- Family: Cossidae
- Subfamily: Ratardinae; Hampson, 1898

Genera
- Ratarda Moore, 1879; =Shisa Strand, 1917; Callosiope Hering, 1925; Sumatratarda Kobes and Ronkay, 1990

= Ratardinae =

Subfamily of moths

The Ratardinae are a small subfamily of large moths from Southeast Asia.

== Taxonomy and systematics ==
Ratardinae is a small subfamily of moths formerly placed in its own family Ratardidae and related to (and often included within) the Cossidae. Three genera are known, one quite recently described. One species, "Shisa" excellens, was originally placed in the Lymantriidae. The moths are large with rounded wings and strongly spotted wing patterns, and "pectinate" antennae. The relationships of this group to other Cossoidea needs reassessment, once suitable samples are available, with molecular data.

== Distribution ==
About 13 relictually distributed species are restricted to Southeast Asia, occurring in Borneo, Sumatra, Peninsular Malaysia, northeastern Himalayas, and Taiwan.

== Behaviour ==
The adults are very rarely found, feeble-flying, and occasionally are attracted to light, but more likely to be found flying by day.

== Conservation ==
These large moths are so incredibly rarely found and their habitats under such massive threat from large-scale conversion of rainforest in Southeast Asia that their conservation status should be seriously considered and dedicated surveys conducted to assess their distribution and biology. One species (Ratarda melanoxantha) is probably protected by virtue of its occurrence in Mount Kinabalu National Park on Borneo, where it was found once.
