= Degia deficiens =

Scientific classification
- Domain: Eukaryota
- Kingdom: Animalia
- Phylum: Arthropoda
- Class: Insecta
- Order: Lepidoptera
- Family: Psychidae
- Subfamily: Typhoniinae
- Tribe: Penestoglossini
- Genus: Degia
- Species: D. deficiens

Binomial name
- Degia deficiens Walker, 1862

Species of moth

Degia deficiens is a species of moth in the Psychidae family. It is found on Sarawak and the Philippines (Palawan).

== Subspecies ==
- Degia deficiens deficiens (Sarawak)
- Degia deficiens palawanensis Sobczyk, 2009 (Palawan)
