= Politzariellinae =

Scientific classification
- Kingdom: Animalia
- Phylum: Arthropoda
- Clade: Pancrustacea
- Class: Insecta
- Order: Lepidoptera
- Family: Cossidae
- Subfamily: Politzariellinae; Yakovlev, 2011

Subfamily of moths

The Politzariellinae are a subfamily of the family Cossidae (carpenter or goat moths).

== Genera ==
- Holcoceroides Strand, [1913]
- Politzariella Yakovlev, 2011
- Geraldocossus Yakovlev & Sáfián, 2016
