= Anastomophleps =

Scientific classification
- Kingdom: Animalia
- Phylum: Arthropoda
- Class: Insecta
- Order: Lepidoptera
- Family: Cossidae
- Genus: Anastomophleps; Hering, 1923
- Species: A. claosticha

Binomial name
- Anastomophleps claosticha Hering, 1923

Species of moth

Anastomophleps claosticha is a moth in the family Cossidae, and the only species in the genus Anastomophleps. It is found in Argentina.
