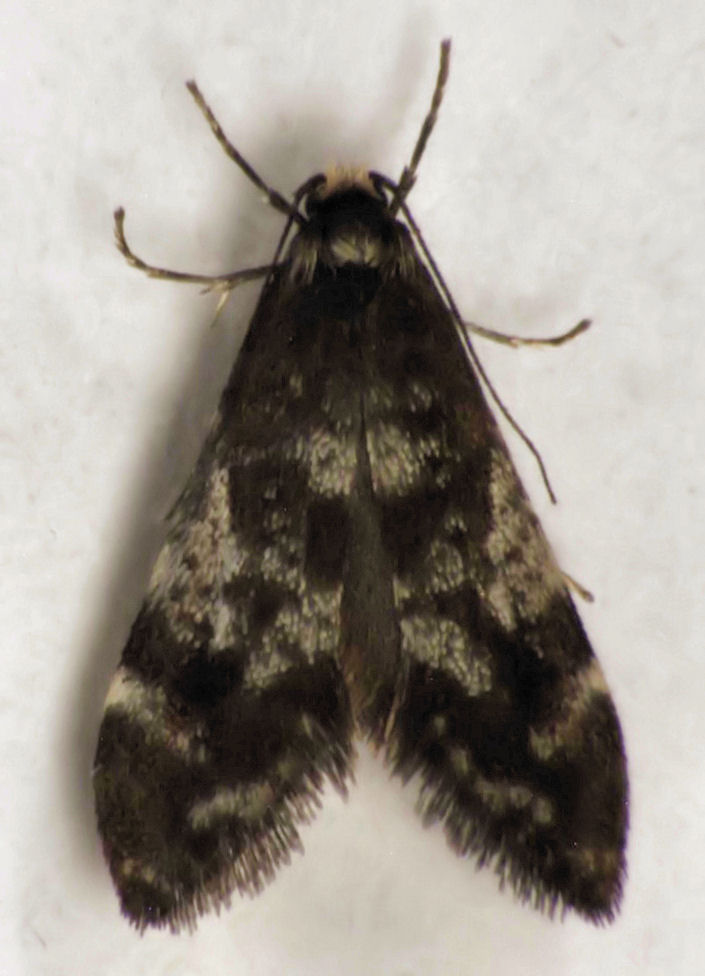
- Lepidoscia lainodes

Scientific classification
- Kingdom: Animalia
- Phylum: Arthropoda
- Class: Insecta
- Order: Lepidoptera
- Family: Psychidae
- Genus: Lepidoscia; Meyrick, 1893

= Lepidoscia =

Genus of moths

Lepidoscia is a genus of bagworm moths in the family Psychidae. There are more than 40 described species in Lepidoscia, found primarily in Australia and New Zealand.

== Species ==
These 42 species belong to the genus Lepidoscia:

- Lepidoscia amphiscia Meyrick, 1893
- Lepidoscia annosella
- Lepidoscia arctiella Walker, 1869
- Lepidoscia barysema Lower, 1903
- Lepidoscia carlotta
- Lepidoscia cataphracta
- Lepidoscia characota
- Lepidoscia chloropetala Meyrick, 1893
- Lepidoscia chrysastra Turner, 1923
- Lepidoscia confluens
- Lepidoscia desmophthora Meyrick, 1893
- Lepidoscia dicranota
- Lepidoscia euriptola Lower, 1903
- Lepidoscia euryptera
- Lepidoscia glabrella
- Lepidoscia globigera Meyrick, 1911
- Lepidoscia heliochares
- Lepidoscia herbicola Meyrick, 1921
- Lepidoscia lainodes Meyrick, 1921
- Lepidoscia ligatus Walker, 1865
- Lepidoscia magnella Walker, 1863
- Lepidoscia magnifica Meyrick, 1893
- Lepidoscia melanogramma Lower, 1903
- Lepidoscia melitora Meyrick, 1893
- Lepidoscia microsticha Meyrick, 1893
- Lepidoscia monosticha Turner, 1923
- Lepidoscia monozona Meyrick, 1893
- Lepidoscia muricolor Turner, 1939
- Lepidoscia niphopasta Turner, 1923
- Lepidoscia palleuca Meyrick, 1893
- Lepidoscia placoxantha Lower, 1903
- Lepidoscia polychrysa Lower, 1903
- Lepidoscia protorna
- Lepidoscia punctiferella Walker, 1863
- Lepidoscia raricoma Meyrick, 1893
- Lepidoscia sciodesma Meyrick, 1893
- Lepidoscia stenomochla
- Lepidoscia strigulata Meyrick, 1893
- Lepidoscia tetramochla
- Lepidoscia tetraphragma Meyrick, 1921
- Lepidoscia trileuca Lower, 1903
- Lepidoscia tyrobathra Meyrick, 1893
