= Westia cyrtozona =

Scientific classification
- Domain: Eukaryota
- Kingdom: Animalia
- Phylum: Arthropoda
- Class: Insecta
- Order: Lepidoptera
- Family: Psychidae
- Genus: Westia
- Species: W. cyrtozona

Binomial name
- Westia cyrtozona (West, 1932)

Synonyms
- Porthetes cyrtozona West, 1932

Species of moth

Westia cyrtozona is a moth in the Psychidae family. It is found in the Philippines.
