= Charmoses =

Scientific classification
- Kingdom: Animalia
- Phylum: Arthropoda
- Clade: Pancrustacea
- Class: Insecta
- Order: Lepidoptera
- Family: Cossidae
- Genus: Charmoses; Turner, 1932
- Species: C. dumigani

Binomial name
- Charmoses dumigani Turner, 1932

Monotypic genus of moth

Charmoses is a genus in the family Cossidae, of which the only member species is the moth Charmoses dumigani. Charmoses dumigani is found in Australia, where it has been recorded from Queensland and New South Wales.
