= Huayna =

Scientific classification
- Kingdom: Animalia
- Phylum: Arthropoda
- Class: Insecta
- Order: Lepidoptera
- Family: Cossidae
- Genus: Huayna; Pinas Rubio, 2006
- Species: H. quillosa

Binomial name
- Huayna quillosa Pinas Rubio, 2006

Species of moth

Huayna quillosa is a moth in the family Cossidae, and the only species in the genus Huayna. It is found in Ecuador.
