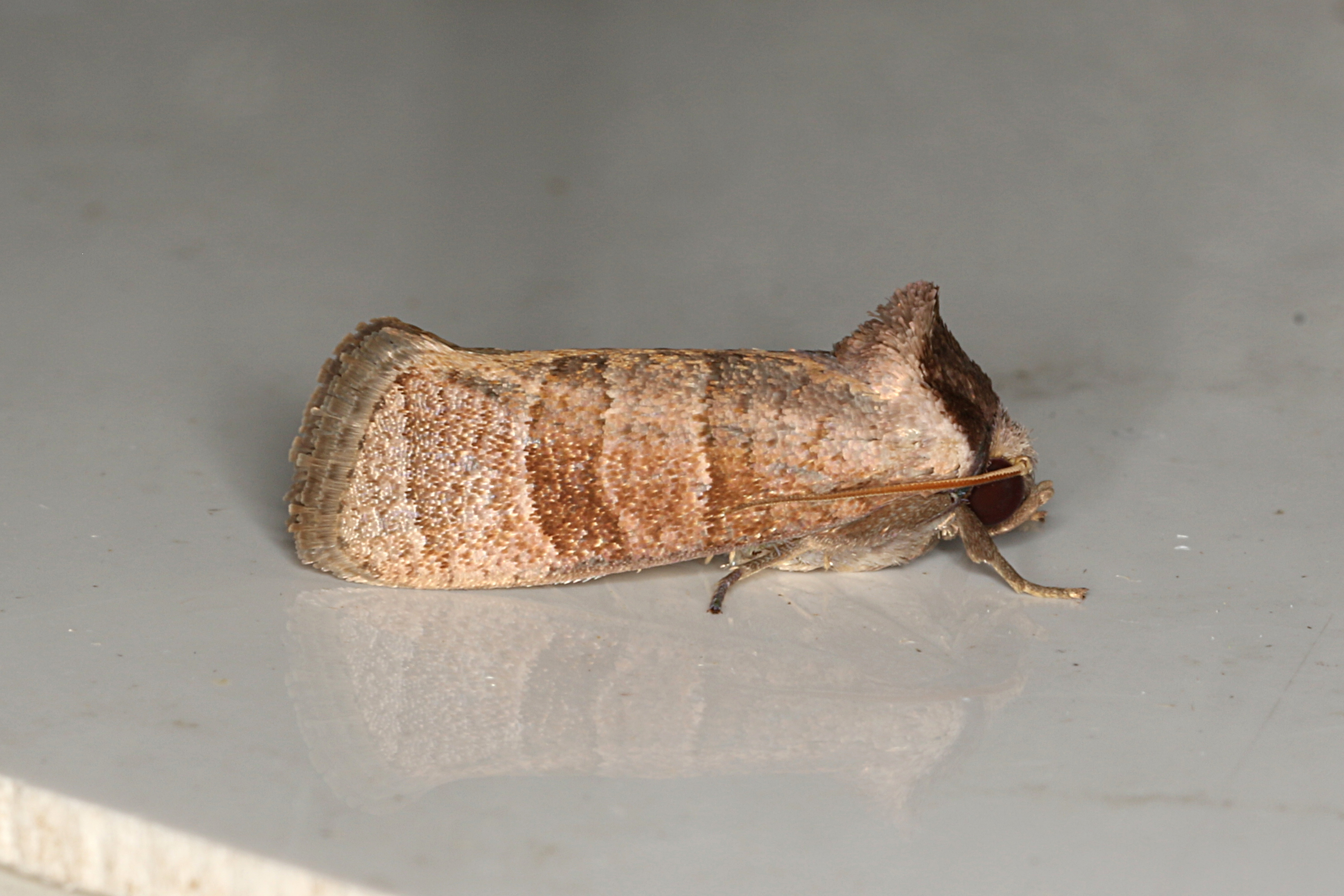
- Palm Cove, Queensland, Australia

Scientific classification
- Kingdom: Animalia
- Phylum: Arthropoda
- Class: Insecta
- Order: Lepidoptera
- Family: Cossidae
- Genus: Eusthenica; Turner, 1916
- Species: E. treicleiota

Binomial name
- Eusthenica treicleiota (Bethune-Baker, 1911)

Synonyms
- Daulia treicleiota Bethune-Baker, 1911; Eusthenica megalaucha Turner, 1916

= Eusthenica =

Species of moth

Eusthenica treicleiota is a species of moth in the family Cossidae and the only species in the genus Eusthenica. It was described by George Thomas Bethune-Baker in 1911. It is found in Australia, where it has been recorded from Queensland.

The wingspan is 26–36 mm. The forewings are whitish-brown, with fuscous-brown fine transverse lines and three fasciae. The hindwings are grey.
