= Psychidarbela =

Scientific classification
- Kingdom: Animalia
- Phylum: Arthropoda
- Class: Insecta
- Order: Lepidoptera
- Family: Cossidae
- Genus: Psychidarbela; Roepke, 1938
- Species: P. kalshoveni

Binomial name
- Psychidarbela kalshoveni Roepke, 1938

Species of moth

Psychidarbela kalshoveni is a moth in the family Cossidae and the only species in the genus Psychidarbela. It is found on Java.
