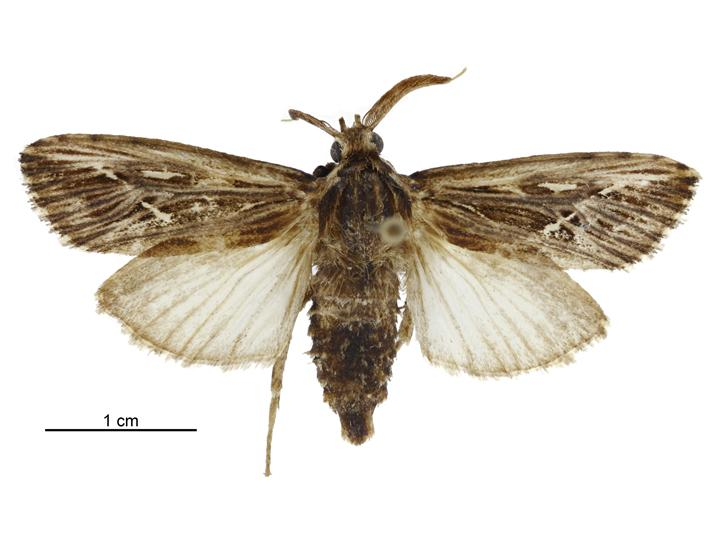

Scientific classification
- Domain: Eukaryota
- Kingdom: Animalia
- Phylum: Arthropoda
- Class: Insecta
- Order: Lepidoptera
- Family: Cossidae
- Genus: Acritocera; Butler, 1886

Species
- See text

= Acritocera =

Moth genus in family Cossidae

Acritocera is a genus of moths belonging to the family Cossidae.

== Species ==
- Acritocera negligens Butler, 1886
