= Dolecta =

Scientific classification
- Kingdom: Animalia
- Phylum: Arthropoda
- Class: Insecta
- Order: Lepidoptera
- Family: Cossidae
- Genus: Dolecta; Herrich-Schäffer, 1854

Type species
- Dolecta scariosa Herrich-Schäffer, 1854

Species
- See text

Moth genus in family Cossidae

Dolecta is a genus of moths in the family Cossidae. It is endemic to the Neotropical biogeographic region.

== Species ==
24 species are recognized in this genus, plus one more of uncertain taxonomic placement:

- Dolecta akhmatovae Naydenov, Yakovlev, Penco & Sinyaev, 2020 (named after Russian poet Anna Akhmatova)
- Dolecta amanosa (Schaus, 1911)
- Dolecta aroa (Schaus, 1894)
- Dolecta bulgakovi Naydenov, Yakovlev, Penco & Sinyaev, 2020 (named after Russian writer Mikhail Bulgakov)
- Dolecta chekhovi Naydenov, Yakovlev, Penco & Sinyaev, 2020 (named after Russian writer and playwright Anton Chekhov)
- Dolecta dostoevskyi Naydenov, Yakovlev, Penco & Sinyaev, 2020 (named after Russian writer Fyodor Dostoevsky)
- Dolecta egipan (Dognin, 1923)
- Dolecta esenini Naydenov, Yakovlev, Penco & Sinyaev, 2020 (named after Russian poet Sergei Yesenin, or Esenin)
- Dolecta gertseni Naydenov, Yakovlev, Penco & Sinyaev, 2020 (named after Russian writer and thinker Alexander Herzen, or Gertsen)
- Dolecta gogoli Naydenov, Yakovlev, Penco & Sinyaev, 2020 (named after Russian writer Nikolai Gogol)
- Dolecta invenusta Schaus, 1892 (taxonomic status unclear, may belong to the genus Givira)
- Dolecta juturna Schaus, 1892
- Dolecta karamzini Naydenov, Yakovlev, Penco & Sinyaev, 2020 (named after Russian historian and writer Nikolay Karamzin)
- Dolecta lermontovi Naydenov, Yakovlev, Penco & Sinyaev, 2020 (named after Russian writer, poet and painter Mikhail Lermontov)
- Dolecta macrochir Schaus, 1892
- Dolecta morosa (Schaus, 1911)
- Dolecta nekrasovi Naydenov, Yakovlev, Penco & Sinyaev, 2020 (named after Russian poet and writer Nikolay Nekrasov)
- Dolecta ostrovskyi Naydenov, Yakovlev, Penco & Sinyaev, 2020 (named after Russian playwright Alexander Ostrovsky)
- Dolecta pushkini Naydenov, Yakovlev, Penco & Sinyaev, 2020 (named after Russian poet, playwright and writer Alexander Pushkin)
- Dolecta rubtsovi Naydenov, Yakovlev, Penco & Sinyaev, 2020 (named after Russian poet Nikolay Rubtsov)
- Dolecta saltykovishchedrini Naydenov, Yakovlev, Penco & Sinyaev, 2020 (named after Russian writer Mikhail Saltykov-Shchedrin)
- Dolecta scariosa Herrich-Schäffer, 1854 (type species)
- Dolecta stanyukovichi Naydenov, Yakovlev, Penco & Sinyaev, 2020 (named after Russian writer Konstantin Stanyukovich)
- Dolecta tolstoyi Naydenov, Yakovlev, Penco & Sinyaev, 2020 (named after Russian writer Leo Tolstoy)
- Dolecta turgenevi Naydenov, Yakovlev, Penco & Sinyaev, 2020 (named after Russian writer, poet and playwright Ivan Turgenev)
