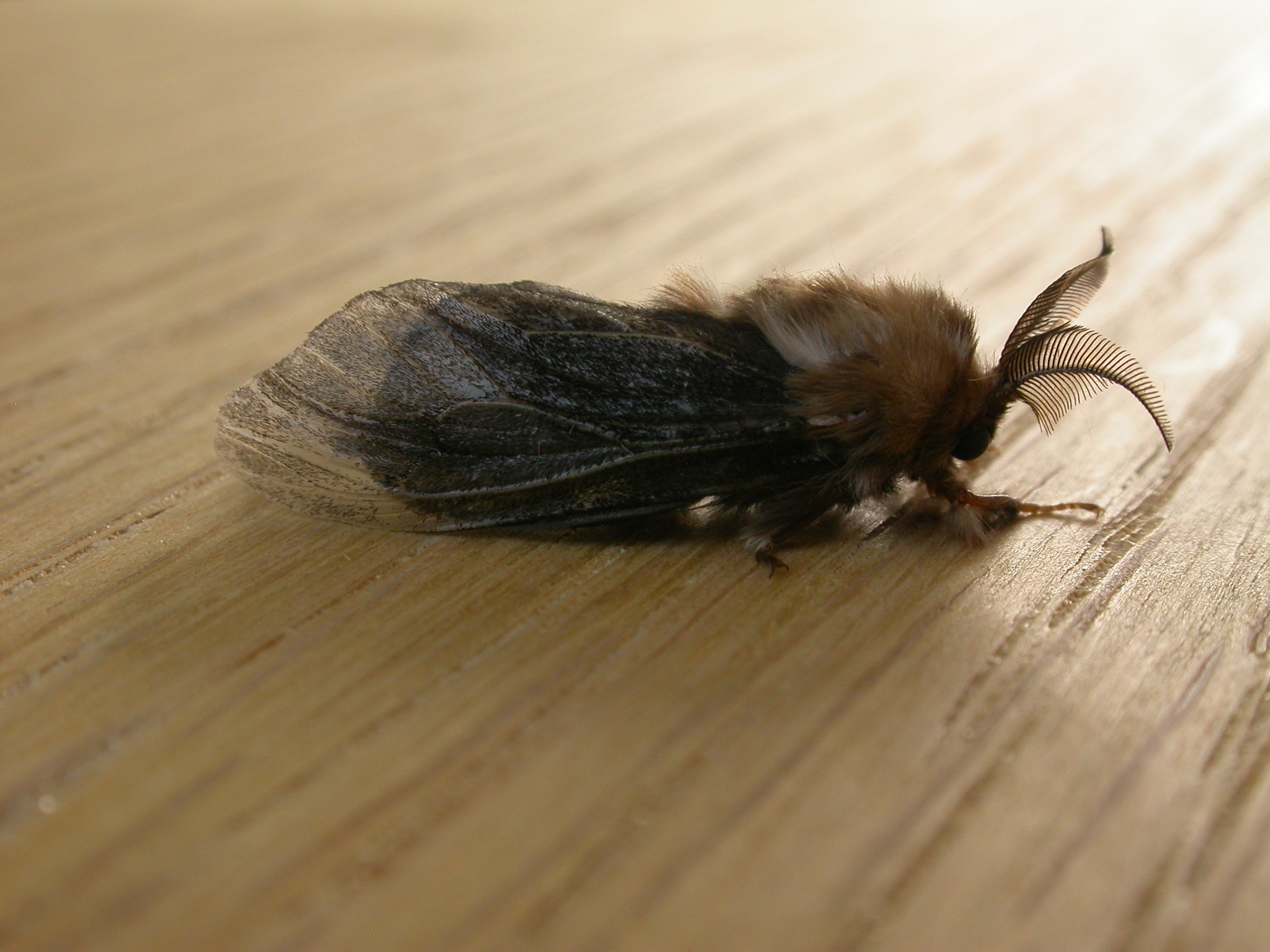
- Clania ignobilis

Scientific classification
- Kingdom: Animalia
- Phylum: Arthropoda
- Class: Insecta
- Order: Lepidoptera
- Family: Psychidae
- Genus: Clania; Walker, 1855

= Clania =

Genus of moths

Clania is a genus of moths belonging to the family Psychidae.

The species of this genus are found in Southeastern Asia and Australia.

Species:

- Clania antrami Hampson, 1910
- Clania guineensis Strand, 1913
- Clania ignobilis
- Clania lewinii Westwood, 1854
- Clania licheniphilus Köhler, 1939
- Clania neocaledonica Sobczyk, 2013
- Clania variegata
- Clania yamorkinei Köhler, 1953
