= Napecoetes crossospila =

Scientific classification
- Kingdom: Animalia
- Phylum: Arthropoda
- Class: Insecta
- Order: Lepidoptera
- Family: Psychidae
- Genus: Napecoetes
- Species: N. crossospila

Binomial name
- Napecoetes crossospila Turner, 1913

Species of moth

Napecoetes crossospila is a moth in the family Psychidae. It was described by Alfred Jefferis Turner in 1913. It is found in Australia.
