= Nomima =

Scientific classification
- Domain: Eukaryota
- Kingdom: Animalia
- Phylum: Arthropoda
- Class: Insecta
- Order: Lepidoptera
- Family: Dudgeoneidae
- Genus: Nomima; Durrant, 1916

Synonyms
- Pectitinea Amsel, 1953; Theatrista Meyrick, 1917; Zesticodes Meyrick, 1918

Genus of moths

Nomima is a genus of moths in the Dudgeoneidae family.

== Species ==
- Nomima chloroptera (Meyrick, 1920)
- Nomima cyanoscia (Meyrick, 1918)
- Nomima deserticola Mey, 2007
- Nomima gaerdesi Mey, 2007
- Nomima montisusti Mey, 2007
- Nomima prophanes Durrant, 1916
- Nomima subnigrata (Meyrick, 1917)
- Nomima szunyoghyi (Gozmány, 1965)
