= Napecoetes belogramma =

Scientific classification
- Kingdom: Animalia
- Phylum: Arthropoda
- Class: Insecta
- Order: Lepidoptera
- Family: Psychidae
- Genus: Napecoetes
- Species: N. belogramma

Binomial name
- Napecoetes belogramma Turner, 1916

Synonyms
- Phaulophara belogramma Turner, 1916; Ardiosteres crossospila Turner, 1923; (preocc. Turner, 1913)

Species of moth

Napecoetes belogramma is a moth in the family Psychidae. It was described by Alfred Jefferis Turner in 1916. It is found in Australia, where it has been recorded from Queensland.

The wingspan is about 12 mm. The forewings are ochreous-whitish, with patchy fuscous irroration. The hindwings are grey.
