= Pseudurgis =

Scientific classification
- Kingdom: Animalia
- Phylum: Arthropoda
- Class: Insecta
- Order: Lepidoptera
- Family: Tineidae
- Genus: Pseudurgis; Meyrick, 1908

Genus of moths

Pseudurgis is a genus of moths of uncertain placement. A study by Regier et al. places it closest to the superfamily Thyridoidea.

== Species ==
- Pseudurgis acosmetos Mey, 2011
- Pseudurgis karoo Mey, 2011
- Pseudurgis leucosema Meyrick, 1908
- Pseudurgis maacki Mey, 2007
- Pseudurgis karoo Mey, 2011
- Pseudurgis mollis Mey, 2011
- Pseudurgis nephelicta Meyrick, 1913
- Pseudurgis ochrolychna Meyrick, 1914
- Pseudurgis poliastis Meyrick, 1937
- Pseudurgis polychorda Meyrick, 1913
- Pseudurgis protracta Meyrick, 1924
- Pseudurgis sceliphrota Meyrick, 1923
- Pseudurgis sciocolona Meyrick, 1914
- Pseudurgis scutifera Meyrick, 1912
- Pseudurgis tectonica Meyrick, 1908
- Pseudurgis tineiformis Mey, 2011
- Pseudurgis undulata Meyrick, 1911
- Pseudurgis vernalis Mey, 2011
