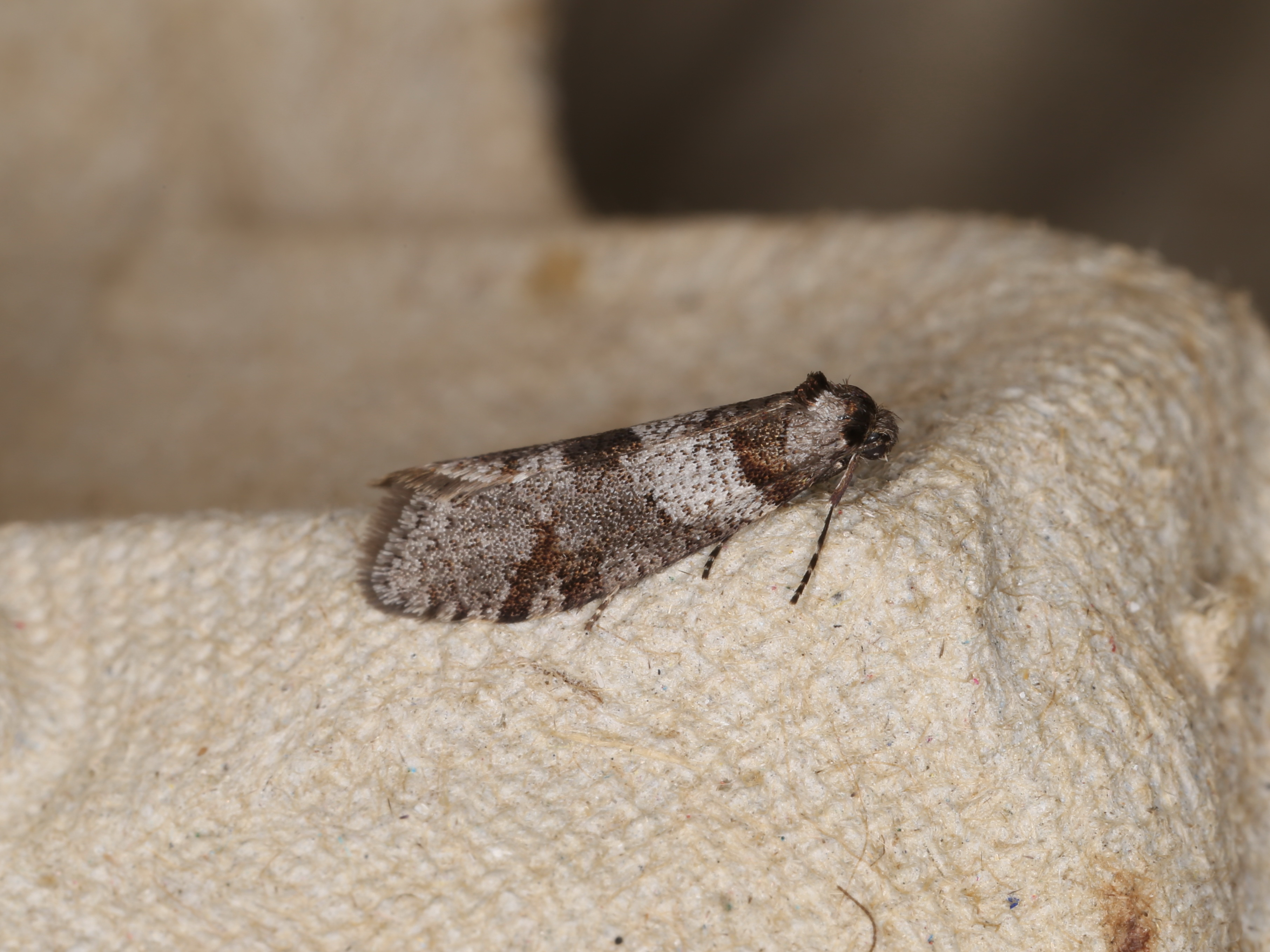

Scientific classification
- Domain: Eukaryota
- Kingdom: Animalia
- Phylum: Arthropoda
- Class: Insecta
- Order: Lepidoptera
- Family: Psychidae
- Genus: Lepidoscia
- Species: L. heliochares

Binomial name
- Lepidoscia heliochares (Meyrick, 1893)

Synonyms
- Xysmatodoma heliochares Meyrick, 1893

= Lepidoscia heliochares =

Species of moth

Lepidoscia heliochares is a moth of the Psychidae family first described by Edward Meyrick in 1893. This species is native to Australia but has been found in New Zealand since 1974.
