= Westia =

Scientific classification
- Domain: Eukaryota
- Kingdom: Animalia
- Phylum: Arthropoda
- Class: Insecta
- Order: Lepidoptera
- Family: Psychidae
- Genus: Westia; D. S. Fletcher, 1982

Synonyms
- Porthetes West, 1932 (preocc.) Schoenherr, 1838

Genus of moths

Westia is a genus of moths in the family Psychidae. It was described by David Stephen Fletcher in 1982.

== Species ==
- Westia cyrtozona (West, 1932)
- Westia nigrobasalis Sobczyk, 2009
- Westia permagna Sobczyk, 2009
