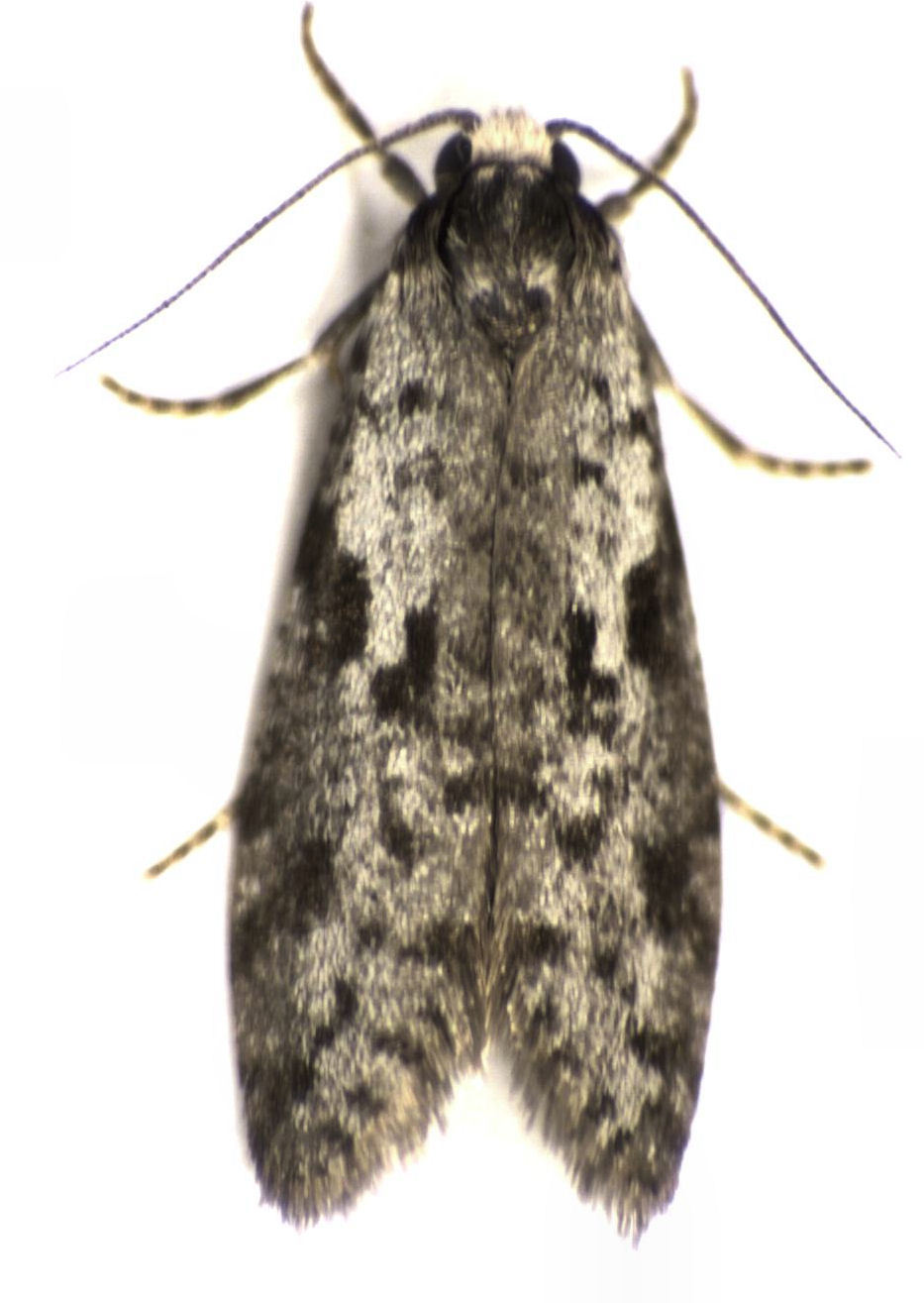

Scientific classification
- Domain: Eukaryota
- Kingdom: Animalia
- Phylum: Arthropoda
- Class: Insecta
- Order: Lepidoptera
- Family: Psychidae
- Genus: Lepidoscia
- Species: L. protorna

Binomial name
- Lepidoscia protorna (Meyrick, 1893)

Synonyms
- Xysmatodoma protorna Meyrick, 1893

= Lepidoscia protorna =

Species of moth

Lepidoscia protorna is a moth of the Psychidae family first described by Edward Meyrick in 1893. This species is native to Australia but has been found in New Zealand since 1978.
