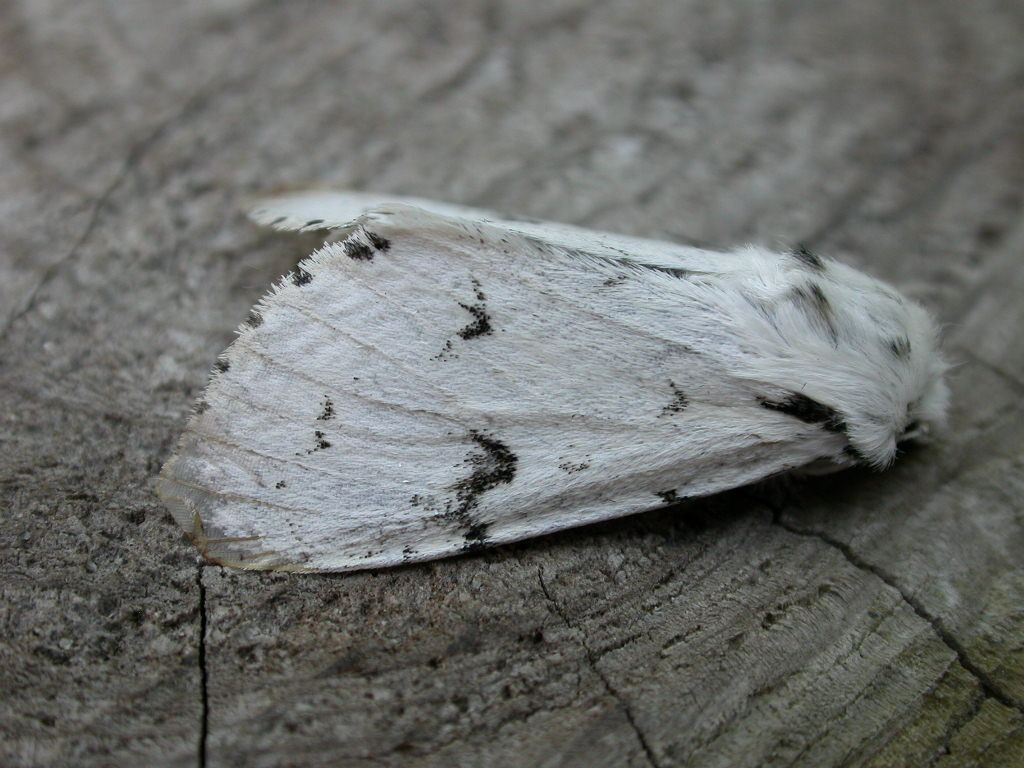

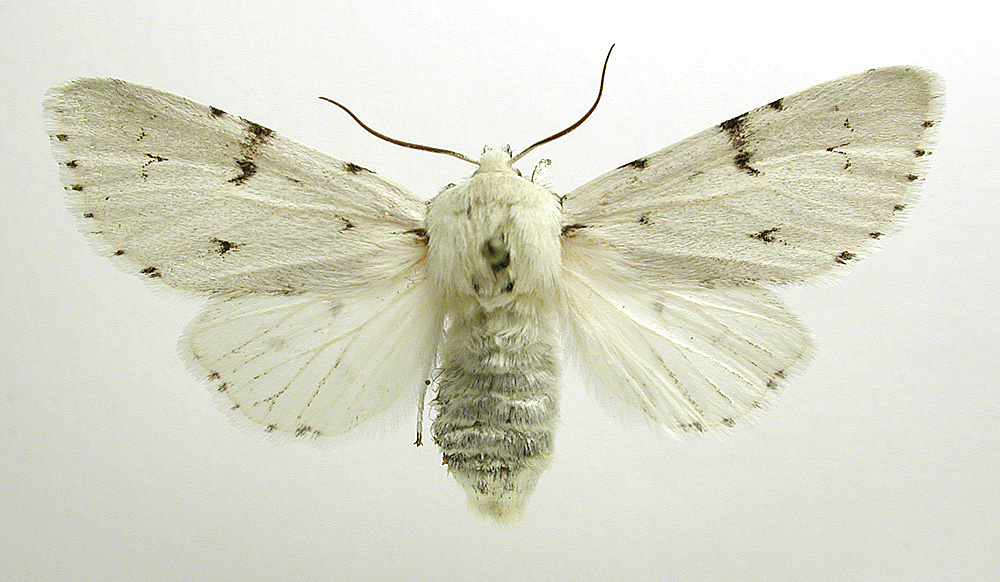

Scientific classification
- Kingdom: Animalia
- Phylum: Arthropoda
- Clade: Pancrustacea
- Class: Insecta
- Order: Lepidoptera
- Superfamily: Noctuoidea
- Family: Noctuidae
- Genus: Acronicta
- Species: A. leporina

Binomial name
- Acronicta leporina (Linnaeus, 1758)

= Miller (moth) =

The miller

Species of moth

The miller (Acronicta leporina) is a moth of the family Noctuidae. It is found throughout Europe apart from the far south-east. The range extends from the South of Spain, Central Italy and Bulgaria to Scotland and Central Scandinavia, crossing the Arctic Circle in Finland and Norway. Outside Europe it is only known in North Africa. In the Eastern Palearctic and the Nearctic realm it is replaced by Acronicta vulpina, (Grote, 1883) formerly known as Acronicta leporina subspecies vulpina.

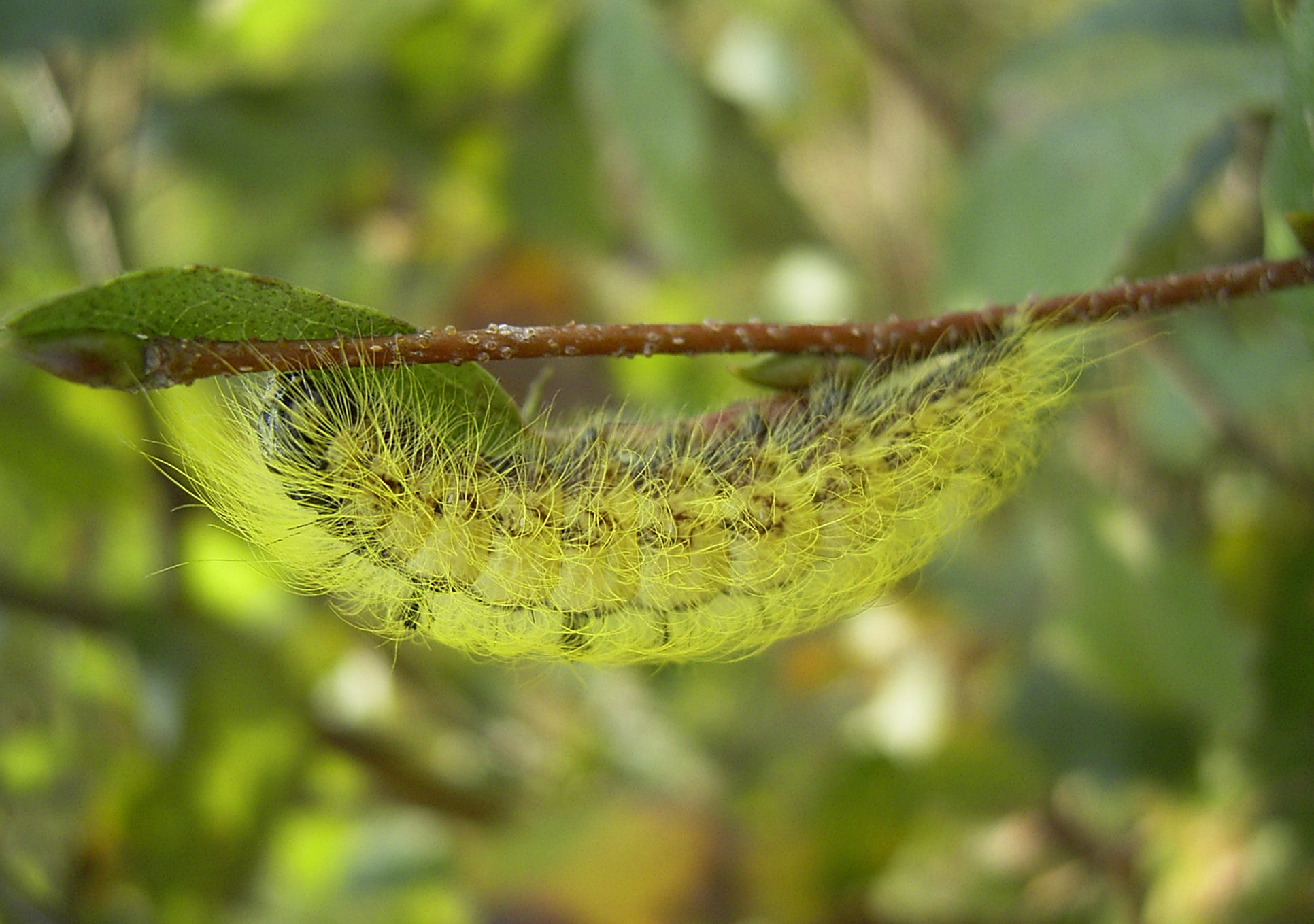
Caterpillar

== Description ==
This is a variable but always distinctive species, the forewings ranging from almost white to dark grey (pale grey being the most common colour form) with characteristic crescent-shaped black markings. The hindwings are white. The wingspan is 1.5-1.69 in (38–43 mm). Adults of this species fly at night from June to August and will come to light and sugar but are not especially strongly attracted.

== Technical description and variation ==
Forewing white, the lines indicated by black spots. Larva pale green, or yellowish, with long silky white hairs, which are also sometimes yellowish, curling over the sides; — ab. bradyporina Tr. (3a), occurring in N. Europe and the commoner form in Britain, has the wings dusted with grey, and the markings more developed. — ab. semivirga Tutt has the outer margin of forewing broadly grey. — In leporella Stgr. (= cineracea Graes.) (3 a) confined to Eastern Asia and Japan, the forewing is greyish white with indistinct markings. — ab. rosea Tutt (= la rose Engr.) is said to have the forewing and the segmental incisions of abdomen of a bright rose colour.

== Biology ==
The larva is green, covered in long white or yellow hairs. It feeds on a variety of trees (see list below), often feeding on bark and soft wood. This species overwinters as a pupa, sometimes spending two winters in this form.

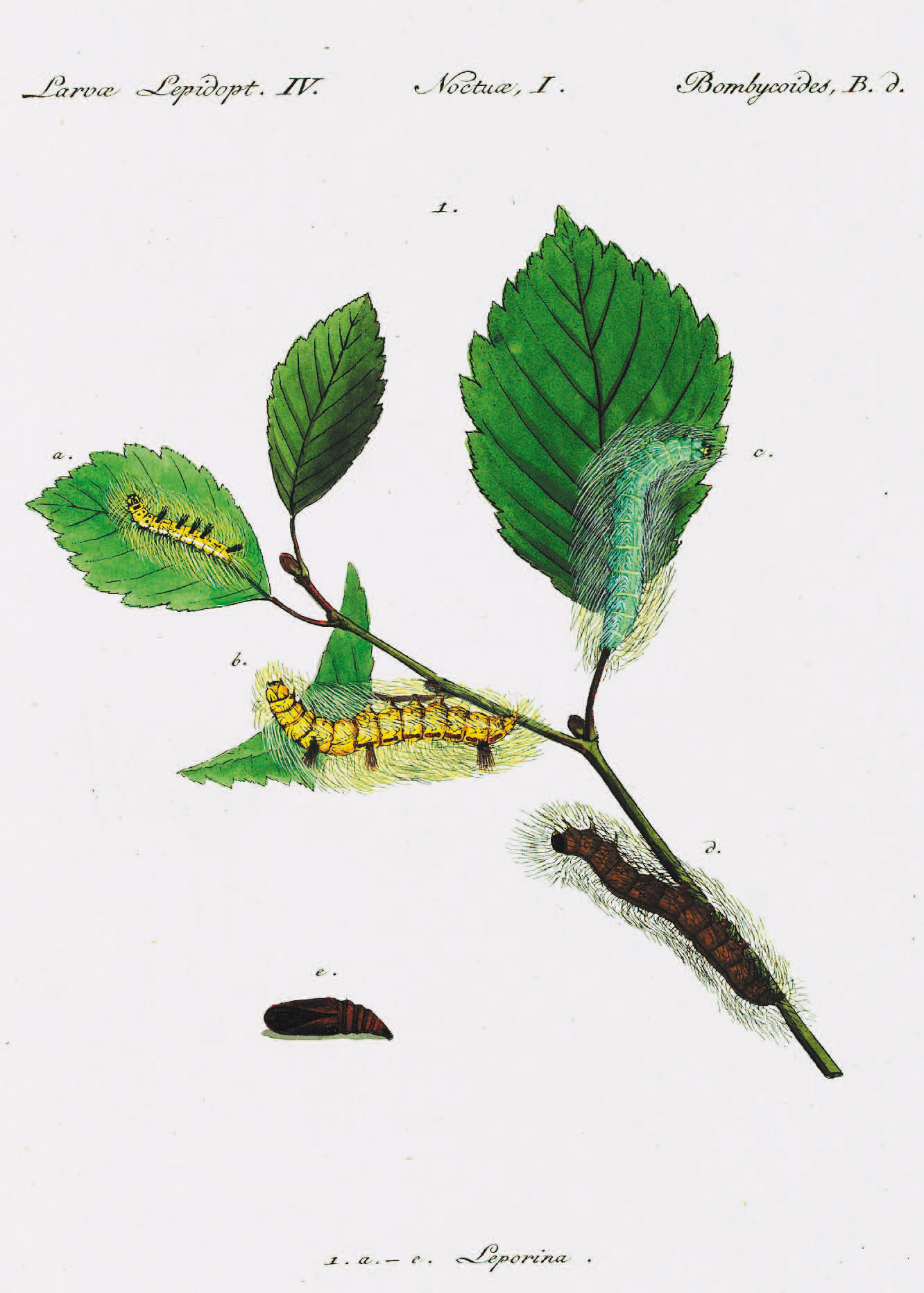
Different larva instars and pupa taken from Jacob Hübner's Geschichte europäischer Schmetterlinge

== Recorded food plants ==
- Acer - Norway maple
- Alnus - alder
- Betula - birch
- Corylus - hazel
- Fagus - beech
- Nicotiana - tobacco
- Populus - poplar
- Quercus - oak
- Salix - willow
- Sorbus - whitebeam and allies

== Notes ==
1. The flight season refers to the British Isles. This may vary in other parts of the range.
