= Achthina =

Scientific classification
- Kingdom: Animalia
- Phylum: Arthropoda
- Clade: Pancrustacea
- Class: Insecta
- Order: Lepidoptera
- Family: Dudgeoneidae
- Genus: Achthina; Durrant, 1916
- Species: A. ctenodes

Binomial name
- Achthina ctenodes Durrant, 1916

Genus of moths

Achthina ctenodes is a moth in the family Dudgeoneidae, and the only species in the genus Achthina. It is found in Kenya.
