= Nomima szunyoghyi =

Scientific classification
- Kingdom: Animalia
- Phylum: Arthropoda
- Clade: Pancrustacea
- Class: Insecta
- Order: Lepidoptera
- Family: Dudgeoneidae
- Genus: Nomima
- Species: N. szunyoghyi

Binomial name
- Nomima szunyoghyi (Gozmány, 1965)

Synonyms
- Theatrista szunyoghyi Gozmány, 1965

Species of moth

Nomima szunyoghyi is a moth in the family Dudgeoneidae. It is found in Tanzania.
