= Degia =

Scientific classification
- Kingdom: Animalia
- Phylum: Arthropoda
- Class: Insecta
- Order: Lepidoptera
- Family: Psychidae
- Subfamily: Typhoniinae
- Tribe: Penestoglossini
- Genus: Degia; Walker, 1862

Synonyms
- Mekla Swinhoe, 1892; Eusceletaula Meyrick, 1936

Genus of moths

Degia is a genus of moths in the Psychidae family, found in South and Southeast Asia.

== Species ==
- Degia adunca Sobczyk, 2009
- Degia bipunctata Sobczyk, 2009
- Degia deficiens Walker, 1862
- Degia diehli Sobczyk, 2009
- Degia evagata (Meyrick, 1921)
- Degia imparata Walker, 1862
- Degia macrosoma Sobczyk, 2009
- Degia pulverulenta Sobczyk, 2009
- Degia subfusca Sobczyk, 2009
- Degia sumatrensis Sobczyk, 2009
