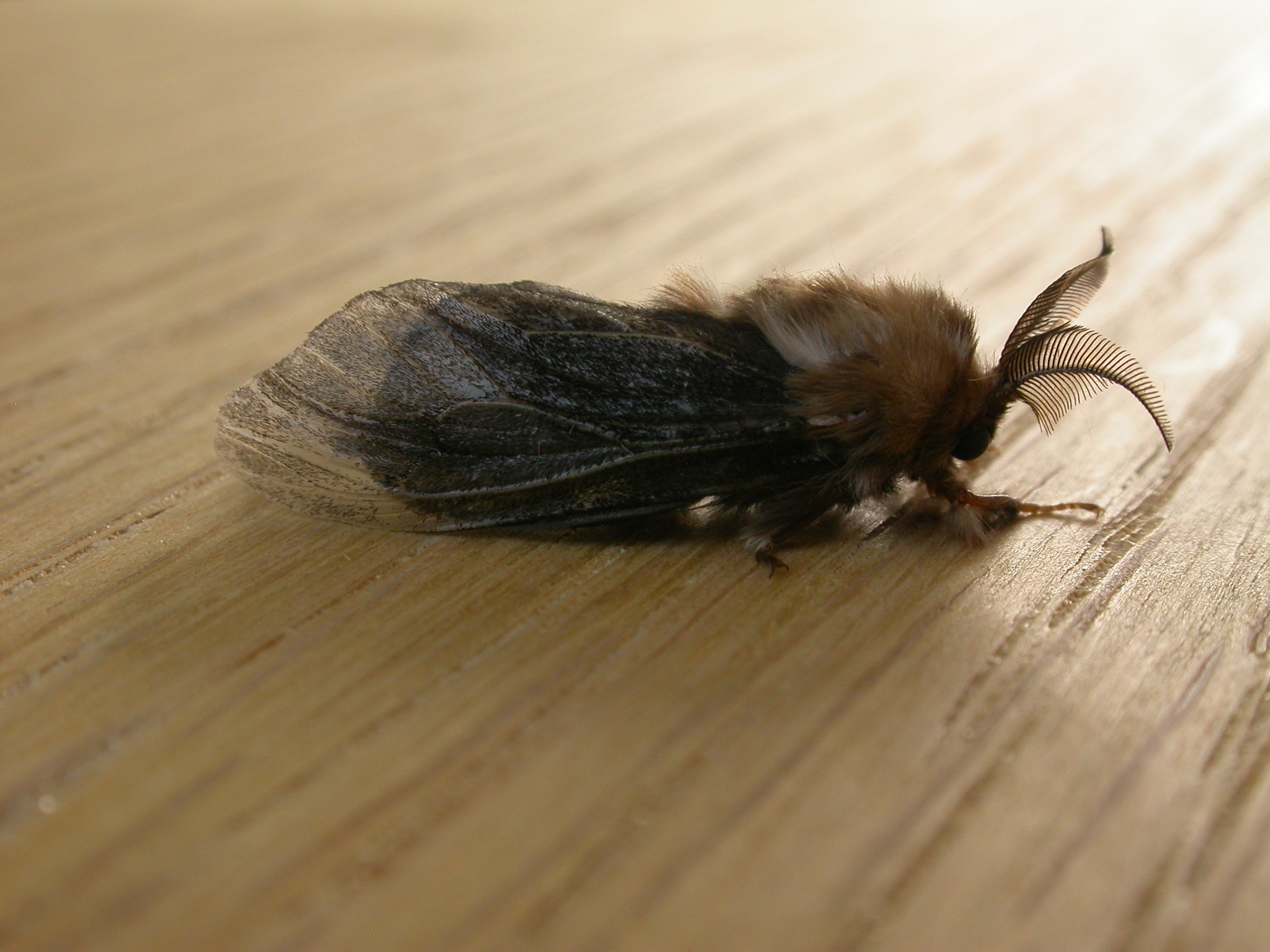

Scientific classification
- Kingdom: Animalia
- Phylum: Arthropoda
- Class: Insecta
- Order: Lepidoptera
- Family: Psychidae
- Genus: Clania
- Species: C. ignobilis

Binomial name
- Clania ignobilis Grote, 1873

Synonyms
- Entometa ignobilis Walker, 1869; Eumeta ernesti Heylaerts, 1885

= Clania ignobilis =

Species of moth

Clania ignobilis, the faggot case moth, is a species of moth of the family Psychidae. It is found in New South Wales, Queensland, South Australia, Tasmania and Victoria.

Adult males have wingspan of about 30 mm. The female is wingless.

The larvae feed on Eucalyptus, Betula pendula, Callitris and Pinus species. It constructs a silken case of 40–50 mm in which it lives and pupates.
