= Trigonocyttara clandestina =

Scientific classification
- Domain: Eukaryota
- Kingdom: Animalia
- Phylum: Arthropoda
- Class: Insecta
- Order: Lepidoptera
- Family: Psychidae
- Genus: Trigonocyttara; Turner, 1945
- Species: T. clandestina

Binomial name
- Trigonocyttara clandestina Turner, 1945

Species of moth

Trigonocyttara clandestina is a moth in the Psychidae family, and the only species in the genus Trigonocyttara. It is found in Australia, where it has been recorded from southern Queensland to Victoria.

They create a cylindrical larval case, with one or two twigs attached to it.
