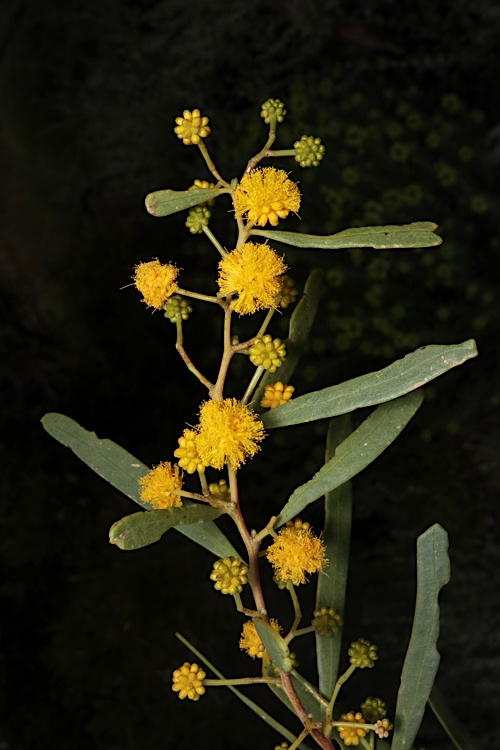

Scientific classification
- Kingdom: Plantae
- Clade: Tracheophytes
- Clade: Angiosperms
- Clade: Eudicots
- Clade: Rosids
- Order: Fabales
- Family: Fabaceae
- Subfamily: Caesalpinioideae
- Clade: Mimosoid clade
- Genus: Acacia
- Species: A. ligulata

Binomial name
- Acacia ligulata A.Cunn. ex Benth.
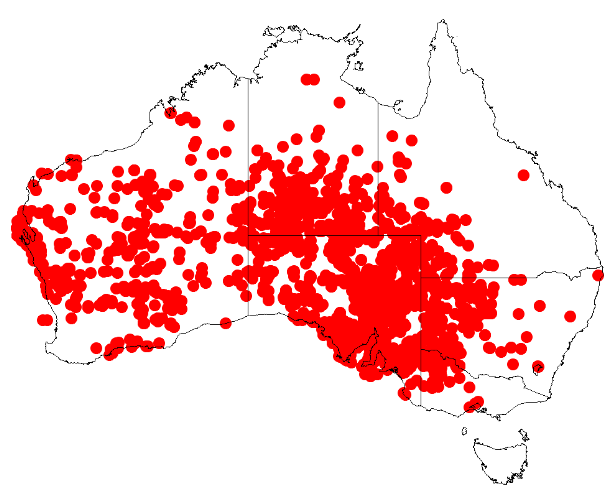
- Occurrence data from AVH

Synonyms
- Acacia ligulata A.Cunn. ex Benth. var. ligulata; Acacia pallidiramosa Maiden & Blakely; Racosperma ligulatum (Benth.) Pedley; Acacia bivenosa subsp. wayi auct. non (Maiden) Pedley Austrobaileya 1(3): 272, p.p.; Acacia salicina auct. non Lindl.: Bentham, G. (5 October 1864) p.p.; Acacia salicina auct. non Lindl.: Maiden, J.H. (June 1910), The Forest Flora of New South Wales 4(39) p.p.

= Acacia ligulata =

Sandhill wattle

Species of plant

Acacia ligulata is a flowering plant in the family Fabaceae. It is a dense, rounded shrub with bright yellow flower heads and is widespread in all states of mainland Australia. Its common names include sandhill wattle, umbrella bush, marpoo, dune wattle, small coobah, wirra, and watarrka (also spelt watarka).

== Description ==
Acacia ligulata grows as an erect or spreading shrub, 2–4 m (6 ft 7 in – 13 ft 1 in) tall and 3 metres across, sometimes dome-shaped, often branching from the ground. The bark is often grooved at the base, but is otherwise smooth. Its branchlets are angular with yellowish ribs, often with hair.

The phyllodes, appearing like leaves, are light to blue green, usually linear-oblong, slightly curved, 30–100 mm (1.2–3.9 in) long and 4–10 mm (0.16–0.39 in) wide, thick, hairless and wrinkled during dry periods. They have a prominent yellowish mid-vein, the lateral veins not apparent. The tip of the phyllode is blunt with a small, hard, downward pointing tip.. Two to four glands are found below the centre of the phyllode and near the tip.

The flowers are borne in two to five spherical heads in racemes 3–20 mm (0.12–0.79 in) long on peduncles 2–10 mm (0.079–0.394 in) long, each head 5–6 mm (0.20–0.24 in) in diameter, with 19 to 24 deep golden yellow flowers.

The seed pods, legumes, are light brown and curved, 50–100 mm (2.0–3.9 in) long and 5–10 mm (0.20–0.39 in) wide, constricted between the seeds and breaking easily into one-seeded segments. The stalk of the seed pod is orange to red. The seeds appear black and oval shaped, normally 4–6 mm (0.16–0.24 in) long, shiny brown with a yellow-orange or red aril.

== Taxonomy and naming ==
Acacia ligulata belongs to the A. bivenosa group of 12 species. Previously considered a variety of A. salicina, differing by its rigid branches, undivided crown, and seed pod characteristics. Earlier literature mentions A. williamsonii as a synonym, other literature places the species in the family Mimosaceae.

The specific epithet (ligulata) refers to the shape of the phyllodes meaning 'strap-like' or 'with a small tongue' in Latin.

Common names include sandhill wattle, umbrella bush, marpoo, dune wattle, small coobah, wirra, and watarrka. The latter name (pronounced what-ARR-kah) is the Luritja word for the species, and gives its name to the Aboriginal (Luritja and Arrernte) name for Kings Canyon, as well as the Watarrka National Park, in the Northern Territory.

== Distribution and habitat ==
Acacia ligulata is one of the most widespread species of Acacia in Australia, common to central and southern Australia, mostly south of the Tropic of Capricorn in arid areas.

Charles Sturt called the habitat ‘stupendous and almost insurmountable sand-ridges of a fiery red’. This area of north-west New South Wales, the Sand Plain Mulga Shrublands, supports an open cover of shrubs and tussock grasses.

This species of wattle is found on sand dunes, the fringes of salt lakes and on floodplains, in mulga and bluebush communities, in woodlands, in mallee communities.

== Ecology ==
Sandhill wattle grows in dense shrub communities on sand dunes, otherwise singly scattered. Fast-growing, it stabilises sand dunes and regenerates quickly after disturbance, such as overgrazing. It is known for potential weediness due to rapid regrowth.

It is found in the hottest and driest climates of Australia with rainfall of less than 200mm and survives light frost. It is an indicative species in sand plain mulga shrublands and was used in an emissions bioassay at Olympic Dam.

Its roots are host to witchetty grub and food for the larvae of the butterfly Nacaduba biocellata. The phyllodes are eaten by cattle and often defoliated by rabbits around the lower part of the plant. Kangaroos and livestock use the plants as shelter. Herbivores grazing on the seedlings can severely limit regeneration.

== Reproduction and dispersal ==
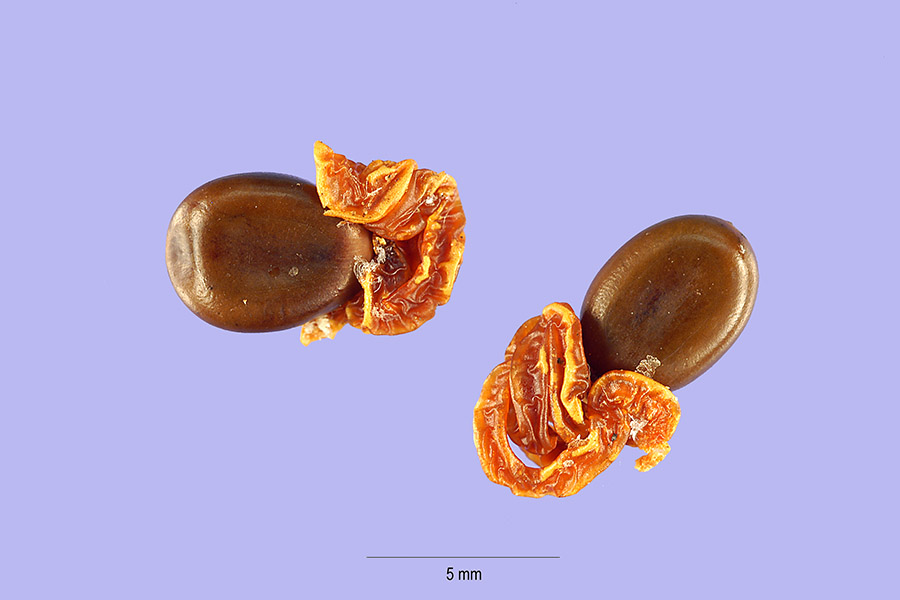
A. ligulata seeds

Acacia ligulata flowers during May to November, depending on the region, odd flowers occurring throughout the year. Seeds are produced between November and January. They have diaspores with fleshy appendages indicating dispersal by birds, including the red wattlebird, and ants (myrmecochory). Ants can transport the seeds up to 180m and disperse it within an area of 3000 m^{2} around their nest.

== Uses ==
Acacia ligulata is used as a hedge and windbreak, to stabilise sandy areas, for revegetation and erosion control, also in areas with salinity or alkaline conditions. It can be grown from cuttings and has been used as emergency stock fodder.

Indigenous Australians have used the plant by mixing its ashes with the dried and powdered leaves of Duboisia hopwoodii to prepare a stimulant chewing mixture (pituri) for trading. Gum produced by this species was used for consumption, and the seeds were roasted and ground to make damper. Leaves and bark were used for medicinal purposes, to treat colds, chest infections, and general illnesses.

== Gallery ==
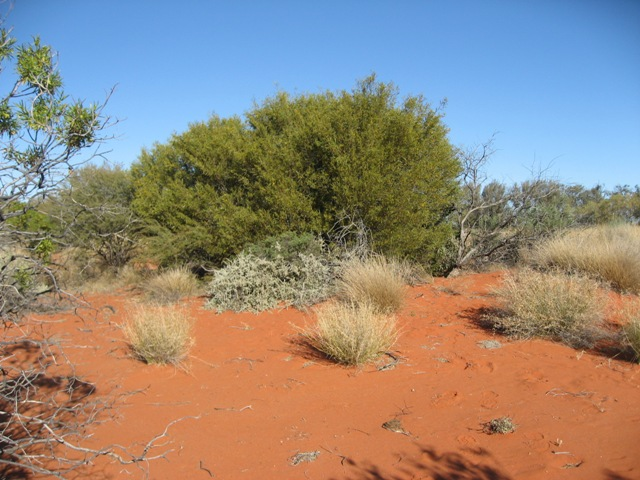
A. ligulata habit, Sturt National Park near Tibooburra, New South Wales (NSW)

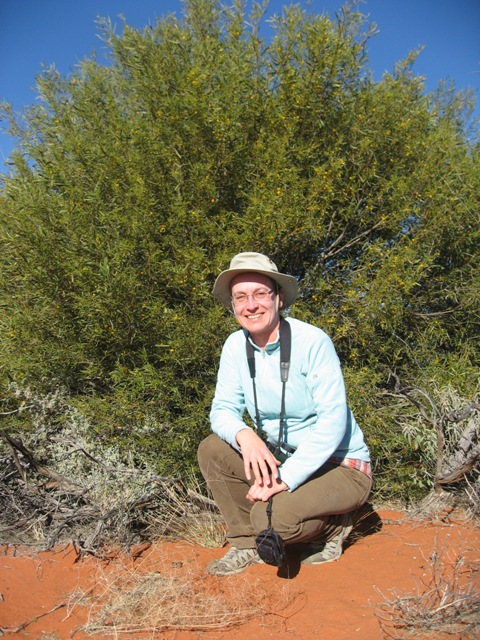
A. ligulata habit with person, Sturt NP near Tibooburra NSW

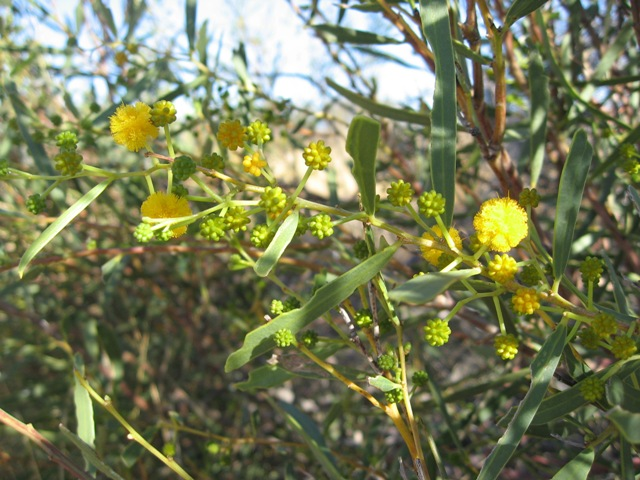
A. ligulata flowers, Sturt NP near Tibooburra NSW

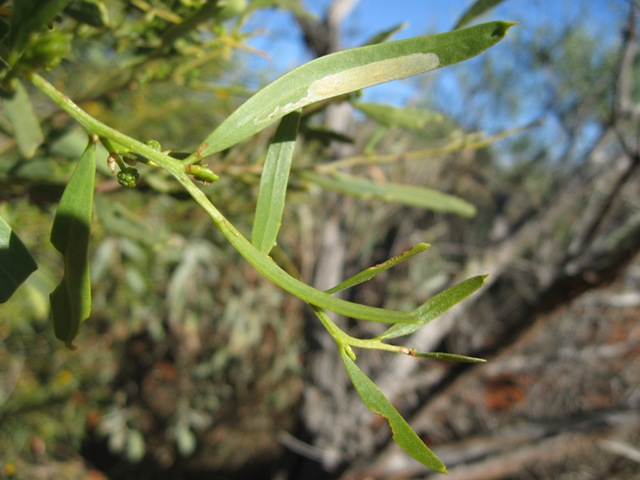
A. ligulata showing phyllodes with mucros, Sturt NP near Tibooburra NSW

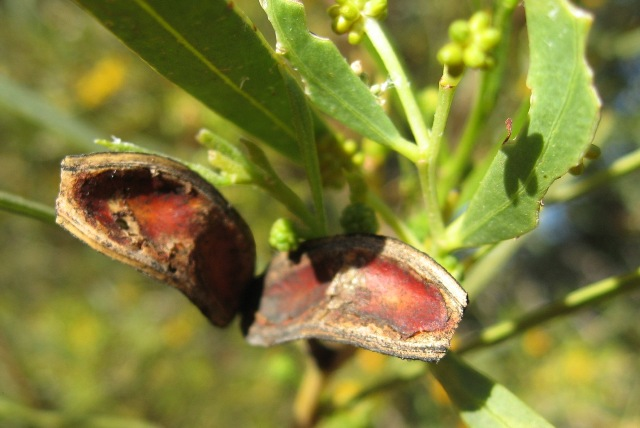
A. ligulata broken segment of seed pod, Sturt NP near Tibooburra NSW

== See also ==
- List of Acacia species
