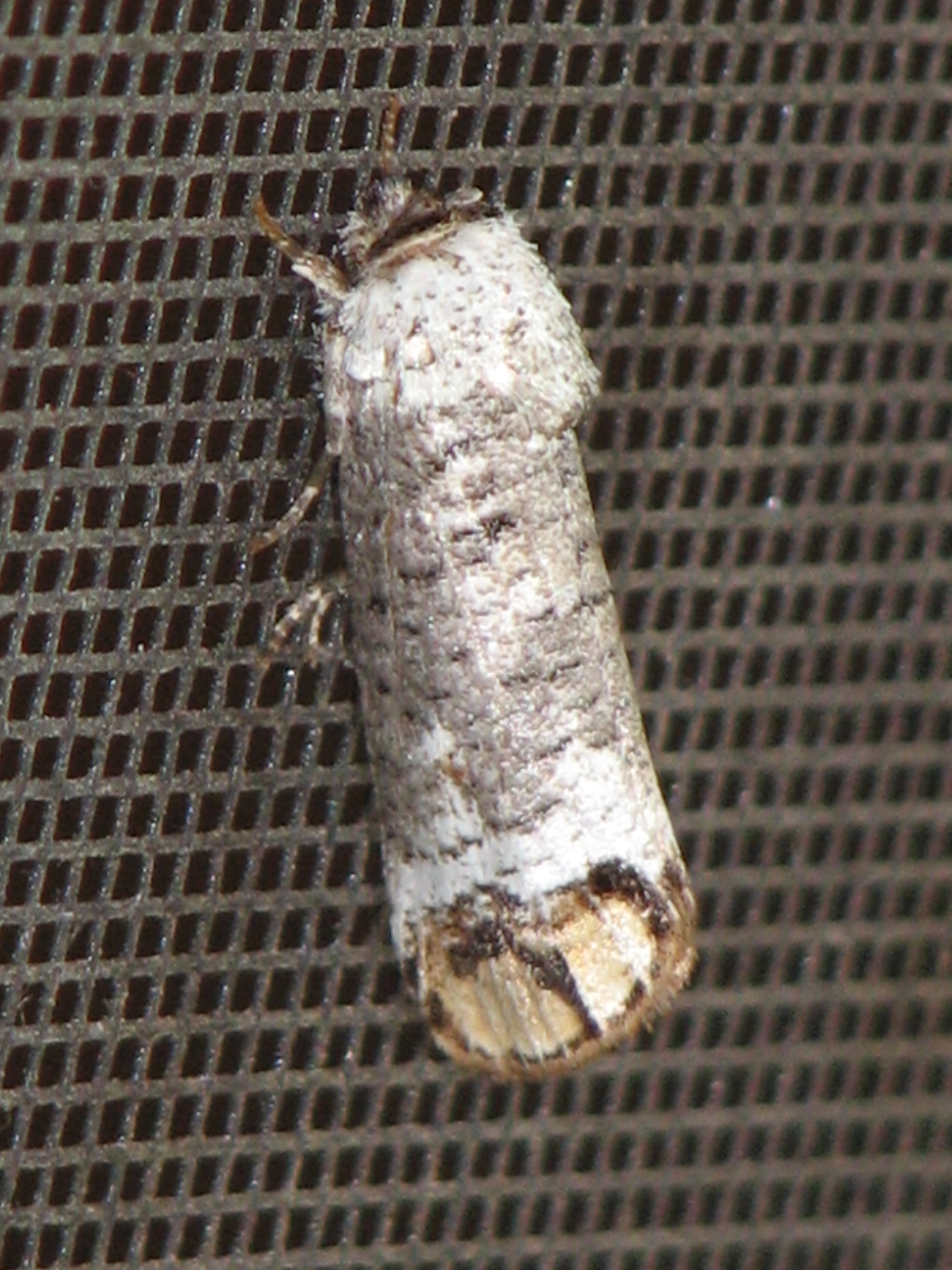
- Cossula magnifica (Cossulinae)

Scientific classification
- Kingdom: Animalia
- Phylum: Arthropoda
- Clade: Pancrustacea
- Class: Insecta
- Order: Lepidoptera
- Infraorder: Heteroneura
- Clade: Eulepidoptera
- Clade: Ditrysia
- Clade: Apoditrysia
- Superfamily: Cossoidea
- Family: Cossidae; Leach, 1815

= Cossidae =

Family of moths

The Cossidae, the cossid millers or carpenter millers, make up a family of mostly large miller moths. This family contains over 110 genera with almost 700 known species, and many more species await description. Carpenter millers are Lepidoptera found worldwide, They are nocturnal, except for the Southeast Asian subfamily Ratardinae.

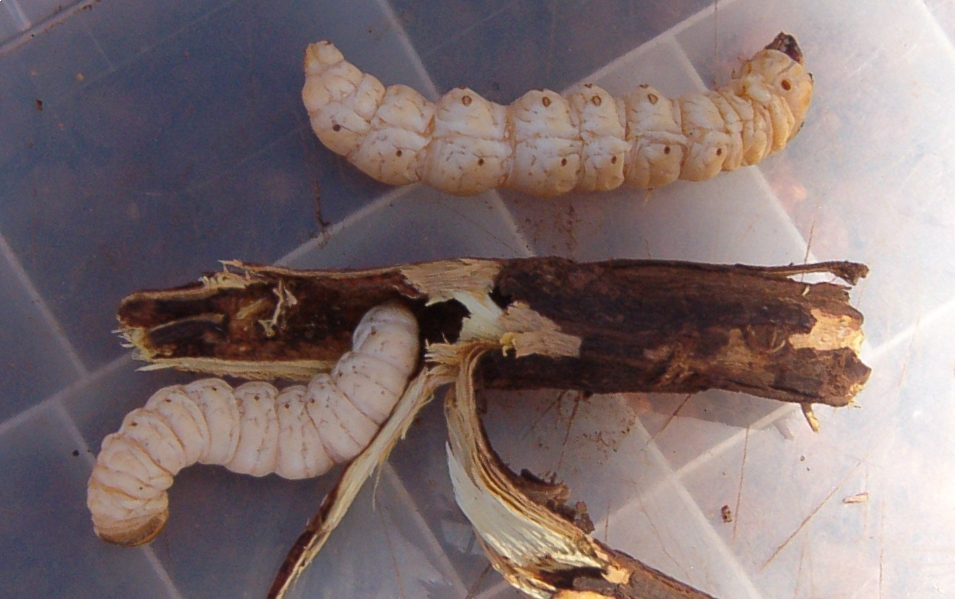
Witchetty grubs (Endoxyla leucomochla) of the subfamily Zeuzerinae

This family includes many species with large caterpillars and moths with a wingspan from 9–24 cm (3 1/2–9 1/2 in). These moths are mostly grey; some have long, narrow wings and resemble hawkmoths (Sphingidae) which are more advanced macrolepidoptera, however. Many are twig, bark, or leaf mimics, and Cossidae often have some sort of large marking at the tip of the forewing uppersides, conspicuous in flight, but resembling a broken-off twig when the animals are resting.

Caterpillars are smooth with a few hairs. Most cossid caterpillars are tree borers, in some species taking up to three years to mature. The caterpillars pupate within their tunnels; they often have an unpleasant smell, hence another colloquial name is goat moths.

The family includes the carpenterworm (Prionoxystus robiniae) and the goat moth (Cossus cossus) which have gained notoriety as pests. However, the large caterpillars of species that do not smell badly are often edible. Witchetty grubs – among the Outback's most famous bush tucker – are most commonly the caterpillars of Endoxyla leucomochla, one of the more than 80 cossid species in Australia. In Chile, the sweet-smelling caterpillars of the Chilean moth (Chilecomadia moorei) are harvested in quantity and internationally traded as butterworms, for use as pet food and fishing bait.

== Systematics ==
Some other animal families, such as the Dudgeoneidae, Metarbelidae, and Ratardidae, have been included within this family time and again. The first is considered a distinct family of the Cossoidea today recognizable by their abdominal tympanal organs which the Cossidae lack, whereas the other two are usually kept in the Cossidae as subfamilies. Some unrelated millers were included in the Cossidae in error, too, such as the genus Holcoceroides which is more primitive Ditrysia, or the Andesianidae which are even more ancient Heteroneura.

The Cossidae were usually divided into six subfamilies. However, numerous new subfamilies have been described recently, the current taxonomy is:

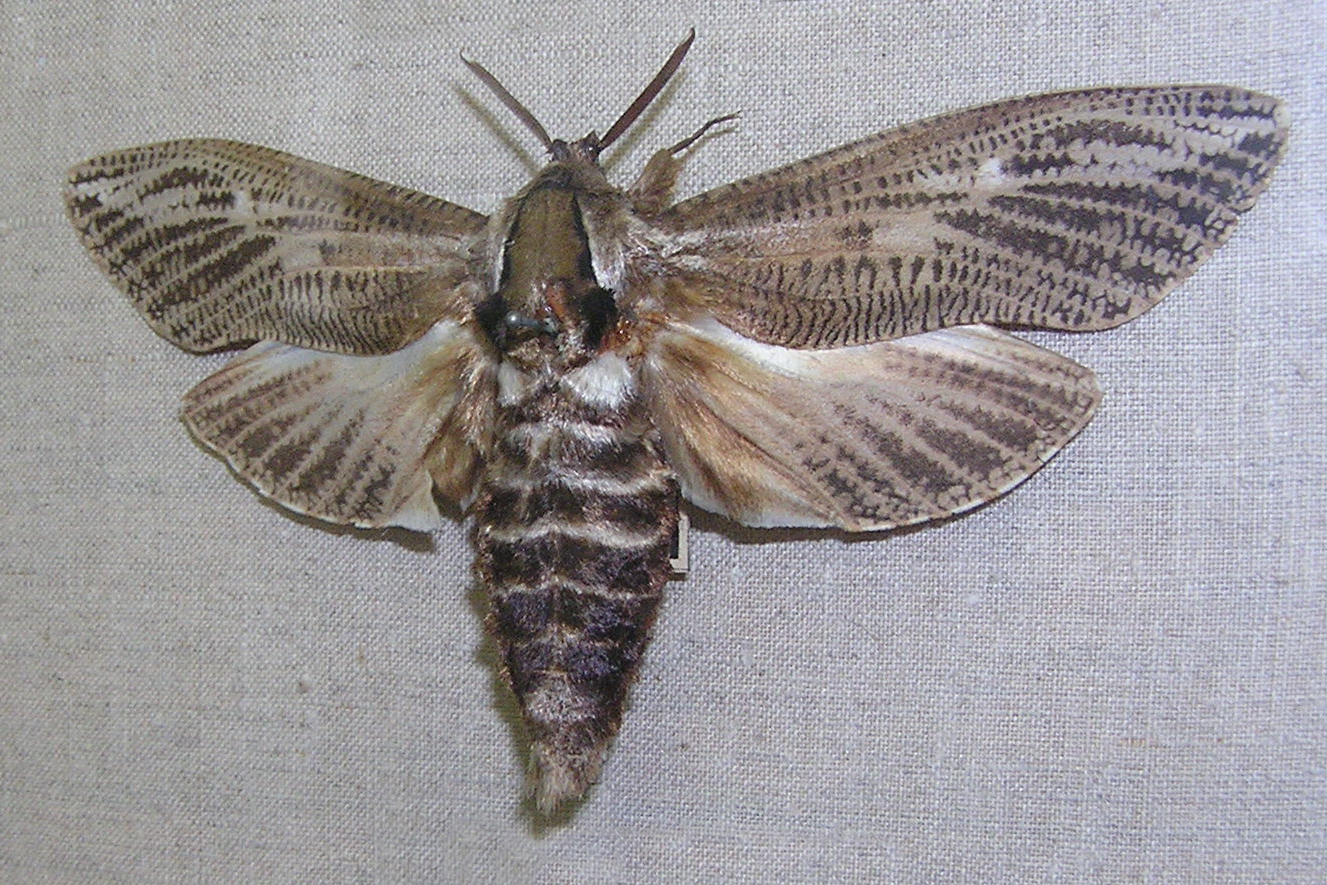
Specimen of the large Zeuzerinae genus Xyleutes

- Subfamily Catoptinae
- Subfamily Chilecomadiinae
- Subfamily Cossinae
- Subfamily Cossulinae
- Subfamily Hypoptinae
- Subfamily Mehariinae
- Subfamily Metarbelinae (disputed)
- Subfamily Politzariellinae
- Subfamily Pseudocossinae
- Subfamily Ratardinae (disputed)
- Subfamily Stygiinae
- Subfamily Zeuzerinae

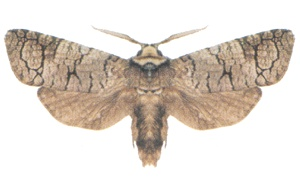
Zyganisus caliginosus belongs to an Australian genus of unclear affiliations.

- Genera Incertae sedis:
- Acritocera
- Anastomophleps
- Archaeoses
- Charmoses
- Dolecta
- Eusthenica (or in Glyphipterigidae)
- †Gurnetia
- Huayna
- Psychidarbela
- Ptilomacra
- Schausiania

== Excluded genera ==
- Moth genera now included in Dudgeoneidae
  - †Achthina
  - Nomima
  - Theatrista
- Moth genera now included in Psychidae
  - Adelopsyche
  - Degia
  - Hemilipia
  - Mekla
  - Trigonocyttara
  - Westia
- Other
  - Pecticossus
  - Phragmatoecioides
  - Pseudurgis
  - Synaptophleps
  - †Xyleutites
