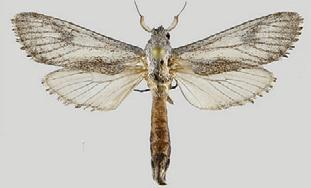
- Male Aethalopteryx diksami

Scientific classification
- Kingdom: Animalia
- Phylum: Arthropoda
- Clade: Pancrustacea
- Class: Insecta
- Order: Lepidoptera
- Family: Cossidae
- Tribe: Xyleutini
- Genus: Aethalopteryx; Schoorl, 1990

Type species
- Phragmatoecia atrireta Hampson, 1910

Species
- See text

= Aethalopteryx =

Genus of moths

Aethalopteryx is a genus of moths belonging to the family Cossidae.

== Diagnosis ==
Aethalopteryx is distinguished from close relatives Trismelasmos Schoorl, 1990, Acosma Yakovlev, 2011, Strigocossus Houlbert, 1916 and Azygophleps Hampson, 1892 by having cup-shaped antennae in both sexes, forewings with slight reticulated patterns and reduced arms in males gnathos and particularly genital structure of the females.

== Description ==
Medium sized moths. Male and female antennae cup-shaped; forewing elongate with slight reticular pattern, often with a spot in the costal area and spots in the postdiscal area; hindwing with indistinct reticular pattern.

== Distribution ==
Species are primarily found in east Africa with some distributed elsewhere in Africa or in the Arabian peninsula.

== Species ==
- Aethalopteryx anikini Yakovlev, 2011
- Aethalopteryx atrireta (Hampson, 1910)
- Aethalopteryx dictyotephra (Clench, 1959)
- Aethalopteryx diksami Yakovlev & Saldaitis, 2010
- Aethalopteryx elf Yakovlev, 2011
- Aethalopteryx forsteri (Clench, 1959)
- Aethalopteryx gazelle Yakovlev, 2011
- Aethalopteryx grandiplaga (Gaede, 1930)
- Aethalopteryx gyldenstolpei (Aurivillius, 1925)
- Aethalopteryx kisangani Yakovlev, 2011
- Aethalopteryx masai Yakovlev, 2011
- Aethalopteryx mesosticta (Hampson in Poulton, 1916)
- Aethalopteryx nilotica Yakovlev, 2011
- Aethalopteryx obscurascens (Gaede, 1930)
- Aethalopteryx obsolete (Gaede, 1930)
- Aethalopteryx pindarus (Fawcett, 1916)
- Aethalopteryx politzari Yakovlev, 2011
- Aethalopteryx rudloffi Yakovlev, 2011
- Aethalopteryx simillima (Hampson in Poulton, 1916)
- Aethalopteryx squameus (Distant, 1902)
- Aethalopteryx steniptera (Hampson in Poulton, 1916)
- Aethalopteryx sulaki Yakovlev, 2011
- Aethalopteryx tristis (Gaede, 1915)
- Aethalopteryx wiltshirei Yakovlev, 2009
