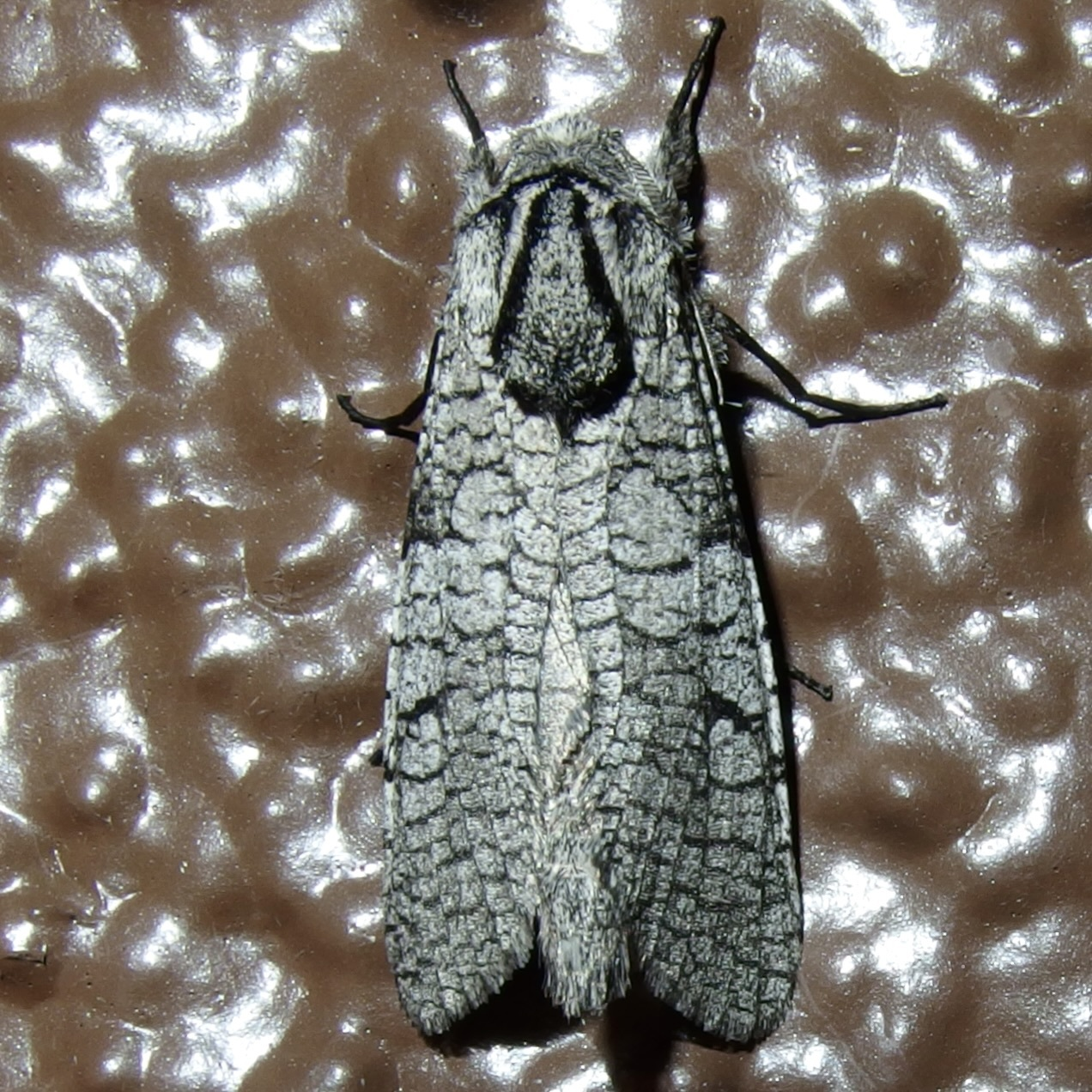

Scientific classification
- Kingdom: Animalia
- Phylum: Arthropoda
- Clade: Pancrustacea
- Class: Insecta
- Order: Lepidoptera
- Family: Cossidae
- Subfamily: Zeuzerinae
- Genus: Hamilcara; Barnes & McDunnough, 1910
- Species: H. atra

Binomial name
- Hamilcara atra Barnes & McDunnough, 1910

= Hamilcara =

Hamilcara atra

Monotypic moth genus in family Cossidae

Hamilcara is a monotypic genus of moths in the family Cossidae. Its only species, Hamilcara atra, is found in North America, where it has been recorded from Arizona. The genus and species were first described by William Barnes and James Halliday McDunnough in 1910.

== Former species ==
- Hamilcara gilensis Barnes & McDunnough, 1910, now Psychonoctua gilensis (Barnes & McDunnough, 1910)
- Hamilcara ramosa (Schaus, 1892), later Aramos ramosa (Schaus, 1892) or Brypoctia ramosa (Schaus)
