= Aramos =

Scientific classification
- Kingdom: Animalia
- Phylum: Arthropoda
- Clade: Pancrustacea
- Class: Insecta
- Order: Lepidoptera
- Family: Cossidae
- Subfamily: Zeuzerinae
- Genus: Aramos; Schoorl, 1990

Moth genus in family Cossidae

Aramos is a genus of moths in the family Cossidae.

== Species ==
- Aramos ramosa (Schaus, 1892)
- Aramos itys (Druce, 1911)

== Former species ==
- Aramos masoni (Schaus, 1894)
