= Z. indica =

Z. indica may refer to:

- Zanonia indica, a genus of liana
- Zeurrora indica, a species of miller moth

== See also ==
- Indica (disambiguation)
