= Carohamilia =

Scientific classification
- Domain: Eukaryota
- Kingdom: Animalia
- Phylum: Arthropoda
- Class: Insecta
- Order: Lepidoptera
- Family: Cossidae
- Subfamily: Zeuzerinae
- Genus: Carohamilia; Dyar, 1937

Moth genus in family Cossidae

Carohamilia is a neotropical genus of moths in the family Cossidae.

== Species ==
- Carohamilia lineaplena (Dognin, 1911)
- Carohamilia ophelia (Schaus, 1921)

== Former species ==
- Carohamilia itys (Druce, 1911)
