= Aethalopteryx atrireta =

Scientific classification
- Kingdom: Animalia
- Phylum: Arthropoda
- Class: Insecta
- Order: Lepidoptera
- Family: Cossidae
- Genus: Aethalopteryx
- Species: A. atrireta

Binomial name
- Aethalopteryx atrireta (Hampson, 1910)

Synonyms
- Phragmatoecia atrireta Hampson, 1910

Species of moth

Aethalopteryx atrireta is a moth in the family Cossidae. It is found in Botswana and South Africa.
