= Butaya gracilis =

Scientific classification
- Kingdom: Animalia
- Phylum: Arthropoda
- Clade: Pancrustacea
- Class: Insecta
- Order: Lepidoptera
- Family: Cossidae
- Genus: Butaya
- Species: B. gracilis

Binomial name
- Butaya gracilis Yakovlev, 2004

Species of moth

Butaya gracilis is a species of moth of the family Cossidae. It is found in Yunnan, China.
