= Cecryphalus =

Scientific classification
- Kingdom: Animalia
- Phylum: Arthropoda
- Clade: Pancrustacea
- Class: Insecta
- Order: Lepidoptera
- Family: Cossidae
- Subfamily: Zeuzerinae
- Genus: Cecryphalus; Schoorl, 1990

Moth genus in family Cossidae

Cecryphalus is a genus of moths in the family Cossidae.

== Species ==
- Cecryphalus helenae (Le Cerf, 1924)
- Cecryphalus nubila (Staudinger, 1895)
