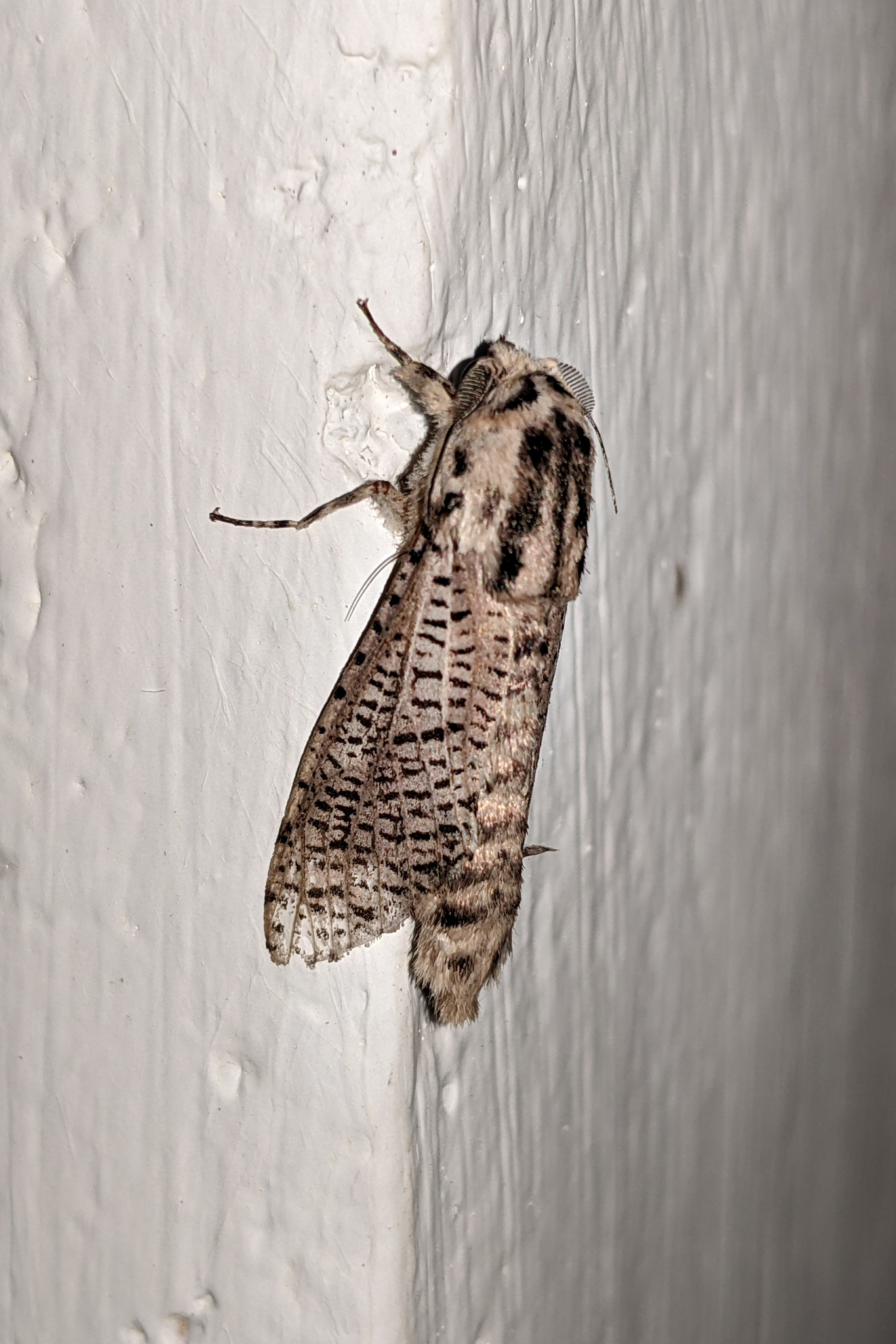

Scientific classification
- Domain: Eukaryota
- Kingdom: Animalia
- Phylum: Arthropoda
- Class: Insecta
- Order: Lepidoptera
- Family: Cossidae
- Genus: Rapdalus
- Species: R. kapuri

Binomial name
- Rapdalus kapuri (Arora, 1976)

Synonyms
- Xyleutes kapuri Arora, 1976

= Rapdalus kapuri =

Species of moth

Rapdalus kapuri is a moth in the family Cossidae. It was described by G. S. Arora in 1976. It is found in India's Andaman Islands.
