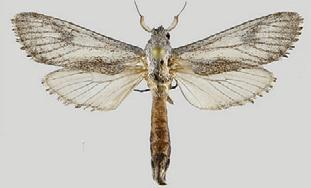
- Male

Scientific classification
- Kingdom: Animalia
- Phylum: Arthropoda
- Clade: Pancrustacea
- Class: Insecta
- Order: Lepidoptera
- Family: Cossidae
- Genus: Aethalopteryx
- Species: A. diksami

Binomial name
- Aethalopteryx diksami Yakovlev & Saldaitis, 2010

= Aethalopteryx diksami =

Species of moth

Aethalopteryx diksami is a moth in the family Cossidae. It is found in Socotra, Yemen, where it is only known from the central part of Socotra Island from two valleys: the Diksam canyon and the Difarroha valley, which are characterized by the following relict woody vegetation: Dracaena cinnabari, Buxus hildebrandtii, Croton socotranus and numerous other endemic plants.
