= Panau (moth) =

Scientific classification
- Kingdom: Animalia
- Phylum: Arthropoda
- Clade: Pancrustacea
- Class: Insecta
- Order: Lepidoptera
- Family: Cossidae
- Subfamily: Zeuzerinae
- Genus: Panau; Schoorl, 1990

Genus of moths

Panau is a genus of moths in the family Cossidae.

Like most moths, the lifecycle of the Panau species would include egg, larva, pupa, and adult stages, with each stage having adaptations that suit their survival and reproductive needs.

== Species ==
- Panau adusta (Roepke, 1957)
- Panau borealis (Yakovlev, 2004)
- Panau bretschneideri (Yakovlev, 2013)
- Panau brunnescens (Roepke, 1957)
- Panau eichhorni (Roepke, 1957)
- Panau goliathi (Yakovlev, 2011)
- Panau princeps (Roepke, 1957)
- Panau quarlesi (Roepke, 1957)
- Panau speideli (Yakovlev, 2011)
- Panau stenoptera (Roepke, 1957)
- Panau variegata (Roepke, 1957)

== Etymology ==
The genus name is derived from Indonesian panau (meaning a white spot on the skin).
