= Butaya =

Scientific classification
- Kingdom: Animalia
- Phylum: Arthropoda
- Clade: Pancrustacea
- Class: Insecta
- Order: Lepidoptera
- Family: Cossidae
- Subfamily: Zeuzerinae
- Genus: Butaya; Yakovlev, 2004

Moth genus in family Cossidae

Butaya is a genus of moths in the family Cossidae occurring in China and Vietnam.

== Species ==
- Butaya auko Yakovlev, 2014
- Butaya gracilis Yakovlev, 2004
