= Aethalopteryx steniptera =

Scientific classification
- Kingdom: Animalia
- Phylum: Arthropoda
- Class: Insecta
- Order: Lepidoptera
- Family: Cossidae
- Genus: Aethalopteryx
- Species: A. steniptera

Binomial name
- Aethalopteryx steniptera (Hampson in Poulton, 1916)

Synonyms
- Duomitus steniptera Hampson in Poulton, 1916

Species of moth

Aethalopteryx steniptera is a moth in the family Cossidae. It is found in Somalia.
