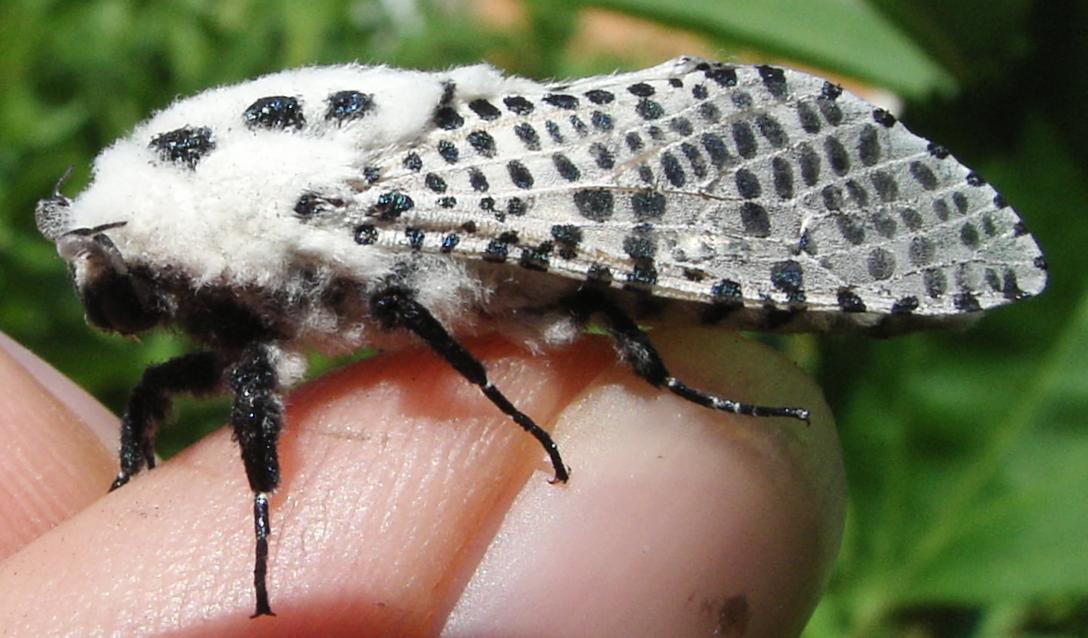
- Zeuzera pyrina

Scientific classification
- Kingdom: Animalia
- Phylum: Arthropoda
- Clade: Pancrustacea
- Class: Insecta
- Order: Lepidoptera
- Family: Cossidae
- Subfamily: Zeuzerinae; Boisduval, [1828]

= Zeuzerinae =

Subfamily of moths

The Zeuzerinae are a subfamily of the family Cossidae (carpenter or goat moths).

== Genera ==
- Allocryptobia Viette, 1951
- Alophonotus Schoorl, 1990
- Aramos Schoorl, 1990
- Bergaris Schoorl, 1990
- Brypoctia Schoorl, 1960
- Butaya Yakovlev, 2004
- Carohamilia Dyar, 1937
- Cecryphalus Schoorl, 1990
- Davidlivingstonia Yokovlev, 2020
- Eburgemellus Schoorl, 1990
- Eulophonotus Felder, 1874
- Hamilcara Barnes & McDunnough, 1910 (tentatively placed here)
- Hermophyllon Schoorl, 1990
- Lakshmia Yakovlev, 2004
- Morpheis Hübner, 1820 (tentatively placed here)
- Neurozerra Yakovlev, 2011
- Orientozeuzera Yakovlev, 2011
- Oreocossus Aurivillius, 1910
- Paralophonotus Schoorl, 1990
- Phragmacossia Schawerda, 1924 (tentatively placed here)
- Phragmataecia Newman, 1850
- Polyphagozerra Yakovlev, 2011
- Pseudozeuzera Schoorl, 1990
- Psychonoctua Grote, 1865 (tentatively placed here)
- Rapdalus Schoorl, 1990
- Relluna Schoorl, 1990
- Roerichiora Yakovlev & Witt, 2009
- Rugigegat Schoorl, 1990
- Schoorlea Yakovlev, 2011
- Schreiteriana D. S. Fletcher, 1982
- Tarsozeuzera Schoorl, 1990
- Voousia Schoorl, 1990
- Yakovlevina Kemal & Koçak, 2005
- Zeuroepkia Yakovlev, 2011
- Zeurrora Yakovlev, 2011
- Zeuzera Latreille, 1804
- Zeuzeropecten Gaede, 1930

=== Xyleutini ===
A tribe erected by Houlbert in 1916

1. Acosma Yakovlev, 2011
2. Aethalopteryx Schoorl, 1990
3. Azygophleps Hampson, [1893]
4. Brephomorpha D. S. Fletcher, 1982
5. Brevicyttara D. S. Fletcher & Nye, 1982
6. Catoxophylla Turner, 1945
7. Chalcidica Hübner, 1816
8. Duomitus Butler, 1880
9. Endoxyla Herrich-Schäffer, 1854 (previously Luzoniella Yakovlev, 2006)
10. Panau Schoorl, 1990
11. Sansara Yakovlev, 2004
12. Sinjaeviella Yakovlev, 2009
13. Skeletophyllon Schoorl, 1990
14. Strigocossus Houlbert, 1916
15. Sympycnodes Turner, 1932
16. Trismelasmos Schoorl, 1990
17. Xyleutes Hübner, 1820
