= Psychonoctua albogrisea =

Scientific classification
- Kingdom: Animalia
- Phylum: Arthropoda
- Class: Insecta
- Order: Lepidoptera
- Family: Cossidae
- Genus: Psychonoctua
- Species: P. albogrisea

Binomial name
- Psychonoctua albogrisea (Dognin, 1916)

Synonyms
- Xyleutes albogrisea Dognin, 1916

Species of moth

Psychonoctua albogrisea is a moth in the family Cossidae. It was described by Paul Dognin in 1916. It is found in Guyana.
