= Chalcidica maculescens =

Scientific classification
- Kingdom: Animalia
- Phylum: Arthropoda
- Clade: Pancrustacea
- Class: Insecta
- Order: Lepidoptera
- Family: Cossidae
- Genus: Chalcidica
- Species: C. maculescens

Binomial name
- Chalcidica maculescens Yakovlev, 2011

Species of moth

Chalcidica maculescens is a moth in the family Cossidae. It was described by Yakovlev in 2011. It is found on the Moluccas, where it has been recorded from the Wetar Islands.
