= Tarsozeuzera livingstoni =

Scientific classification
- Kingdom: Animalia
- Phylum: Arthropoda
- Clade: Pancrustacea
- Class: Insecta
- Order: Lepidoptera
- Family: Cossidae
- Genus: Tarsozeuzera
- Species: T. livingstoni

Binomial name
- Tarsozeuzera livingstoni Yakovlev, 2006

Species of moth

Tarsozeuzera livingstoni is a moth in the family Cossidae. It was described by Yakovlev in 2006. It is found in Cameroon, the Republic of Congo, Ivory Coast, Malawi and Tanzania.

The length of the forewings is 19–22 mm.

== Etymology ==
The species is named in honour of Dr. Livingston.
