= Rapdalus =

Scientific classification
- Kingdom: Animalia
- Phylum: Arthropoda
- Clade: Pancrustacea
- Class: Insecta
- Order: Lepidoptera
- Family: Cossidae
- Subfamily: Zeuzerinae
- Genus: Rapdalus; Schoorl, 1990

Genus of moths

Rapdalus is a genus of moths in the family Cossidae.

== Species ==
- Rapdalus albicolor Yakovlev, 2006
- Rapdalus kapuri (Arora, 1976)
- Rapdalus pardicolor (Moore, 1879) (=Duomitus pardalis Dudgeon, 1899)
