= Tarsozeuzera ustjuzhanini =

Scientific classification
- Kingdom: Animalia
- Phylum: Arthropoda
- Clade: Pancrustacea
- Class: Insecta
- Order: Lepidoptera
- Family: Cossidae
- Genus: Tarsozeuzera
- Species: T. ustjuzhanini

Binomial name
- Tarsozeuzera ustjuzhanini Yakovlev, 2011

Species of moth

Tarsozeuzera ustjuzhanini is a moth in the family Cossidae. It was described by Yakovlev in 2011. It is found in South Africa.
