= Neurozerra conferta =

Scientific classification
- Kingdom: Animalia
- Phylum: Arthropoda
- Class: Insecta
- Order: Lepidoptera
- Family: Cossidae
- Genus: Neurozerra
- Species: N. conferta

Binomial name
- Neurozerra conferta (Walker, 1856)

Synonyms
- Zeuzera conferta Walker, 1856

Species of moth

Neurozerra conferta is a moth in the family Cossidae. It was described by Francis Walker in 1856. It is found in Sri Lanka, India, Taiwan, Vietnam, Thailand, Bangladesh and on the Andaman Islands.
