= Morpheis melanoleuca =

Scientific classification
- Kingdom: Animalia
- Phylum: Arthropoda
- Class: Insecta
- Order: Lepidoptera
- Family: Cossidae
- Genus: Morpheis
- Species: M. melanoleuca

Binomial name
- Morpheis melanoleuca (Burmeister, 1878)

Synonyms
- Cossus melanoleuca Burmeister, 1878

Species of moth

Morpheis melanoleuca is a moth in the family Cossidae. It was described by Hermann Burmeister in 1878. It is found in Argentina.
