= Panau eichhorni =

Scientific classification
- Domain: Eukaryota
- Kingdom: Animalia
- Phylum: Arthropoda
- Class: Insecta
- Order: Lepidoptera
- Family: Cossidae
- Genus: Panau
- Species: P. eichhorni

Binomial name
- Panau eichhorni (Roepke, 1957)

Synonyms
- Xyleutes ceramica eichhorni Roepke, 1957

Species of moth

Panau eichhorni is a moth in the family Cossidae. It was described by Roepke in 1957. It is found on the Solomon Islands.
