= Aethalopteryx dictyotephra =

Scientific classification
- Kingdom: Animalia
- Phylum: Arthropoda
- Clade: Pancrustacea
- Class: Insecta
- Order: Lepidoptera
- Family: Cossidae
- Genus: Aethalopteryx
- Species: A. dictyotephra

Binomial name
- Aethalopteryx dictyotephra (Clench, 1959)

Synonyms
- Kyleutes dictyotephra Clench, 1959; Xyleutes dictyotephra

Species of moth

Aethalopteryx dictyotephra is a moth in the family Cossidae. It is found in south-western Africa, including Namibia and South Africa.
