= Aethalopteryx wiltshirei =

Scientific classification
- Kingdom: Animalia
- Phylum: Arthropoda
- Clade: Pancrustacea
- Class: Insecta
- Order: Lepidoptera
- Family: Cossidae
- Genus: Aethalopteryx
- Species: A. wiltshirei

Binomial name
- Aethalopteryx wiltshirei Yakovlev, 2009

Species of moth

Aethalopteryx wiltshirei is a moth in the family Cossidae which is endemic to Saudi Arabia.
