= Aethalopteryx gazelle =

Scientific classification
- Kingdom: Animalia
- Phylum: Arthropoda
- Clade: Pancrustacea
- Class: Insecta
- Order: Lepidoptera
- Family: Cossidae
- Genus: Aethalopteryx
- Species: A. gazelle

Binomial name
- Aethalopteryx gazelle Yakovlev, 2011

Species of moth

Aethalopteryx gazelle is a moth in the family Cossidae. It is found primarily in Kenya.
