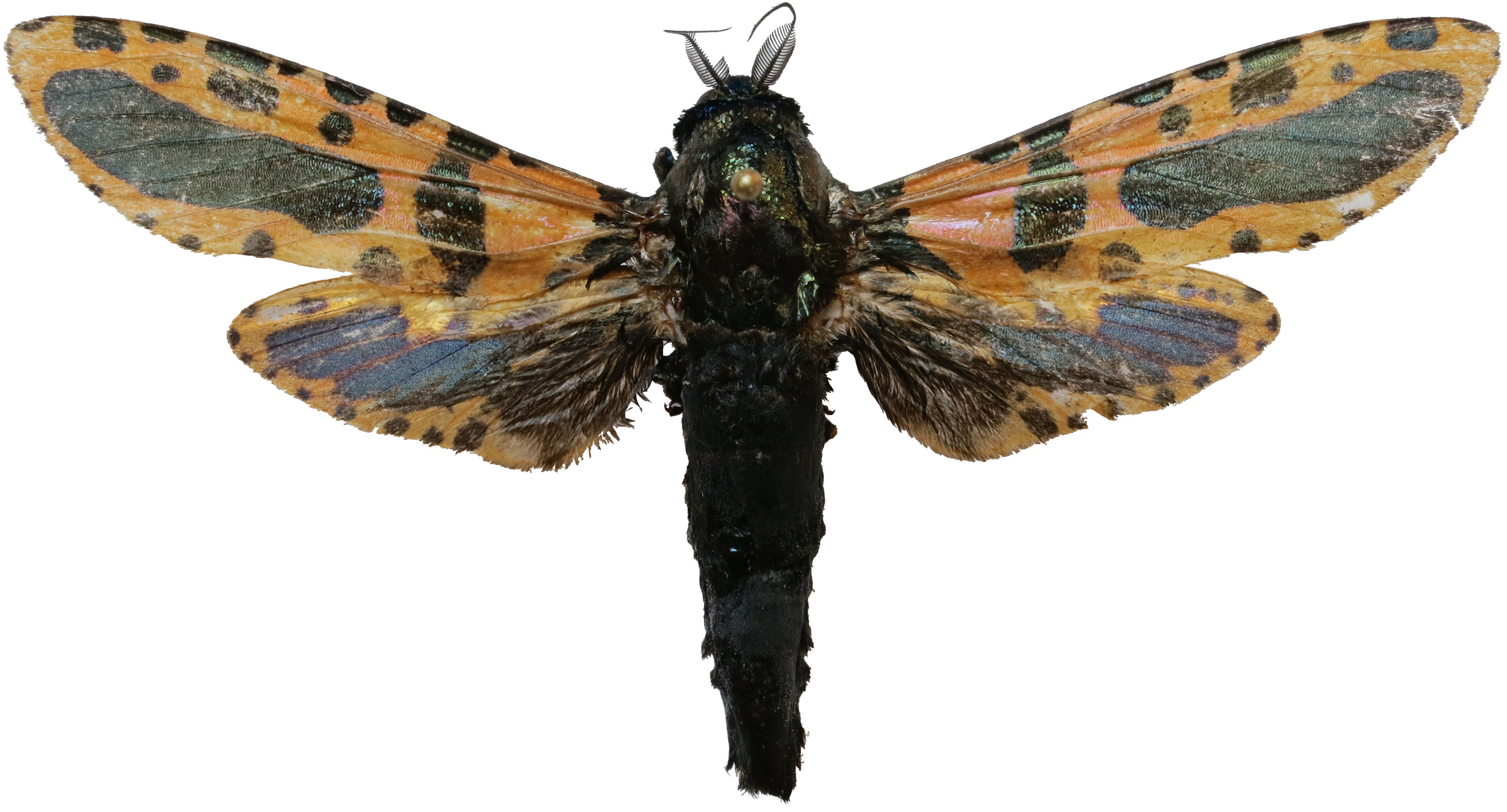

Scientific classification
- Kingdom: Animalia
- Phylum: Arthropoda
- Clade: Pancrustacea
- Class: Insecta
- Order: Lepidoptera
- Family: Cossidae
- Genus: Chalcidica
- Species: C. minea

Binomial name
- Chalcidica minea (Cramer, 1779)

Synonyms
- Phalaena (Bombyx) minea Cramer, 1779; Xyleutes mineus; Chalcidica mineus; Phalaena hyphinoe Cramer, 1779; Zeuzera viridicans Eschscholtz, 1821

= Chalcidica minea =

Species of moth

Chalcidica minea is a moth in the family Cossidae. It is found in India, Vietnam, Myanmar, Thailand, the Moluccas, Papua New Guinea, Queensland and on the Solomon Islands. The habitat consists of lowland rainforests.

Adults have red wings with blue-black patches.

== Bibliography ==
- Yakovlev, R.V., 2004: Cossidae of Thailand. Part 1. (Lepidoptera: Cossidae). Atalanta 35 (3-4): 335-351.
- Yakovlev, R.V. & T.J. Witt, 2009: The Carpenter Moths (Lepidoptera:Cossidae) of Vietnam. Entomofauna Supplement 16: 11-32.
- Natural History Museum Lepidoptera generic names catalog
