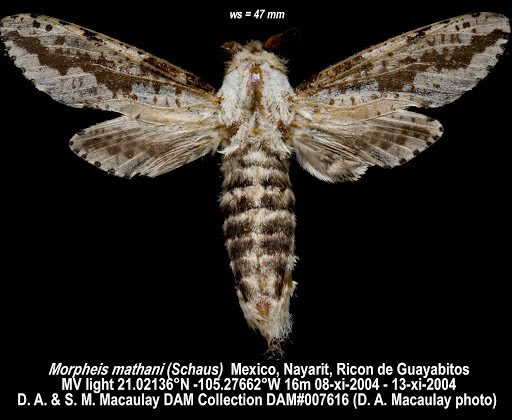

Scientific classification
- Kingdom: Animalia
- Phylum: Arthropoda
- Class: Insecta
- Order: Lepidoptera
- Family: Cossidae
- Genus: Morpheis
- Species: M. cognata

Binomial name
- Morpheis cognata (Walker, 1856)

Synonyms
- Cossus cognata Walker, 1856; Xyleutes mexicana Houlbert, 1916

= Morpheis cognata =

Species of moth

Morpheis cognata is a species of moth in the family Cossidae. It was first described by Francis Walker in 1856. It is found in Mexico and Honduras.
