= Morpheis xylotribus =

Scientific classification
- Kingdom: Animalia
- Phylum: Arthropoda
- Class: Insecta
- Order: Lepidoptera
- Family: Cossidae
- Genus: Morpheis
- Species: M. xylotribus

Binomial name
- Morpheis xylotribus (Herrich-Schäffer, 1853)

Synonyms
- Cossus xylotribus Herrich-Schäffer, 1853

Species of moth

Morpheis xylotribus is a moth in the family Cossidae. It was described by Gottlieb August Wilhelm Herrich-Schäffer in 1853. It is found in Brazil.
