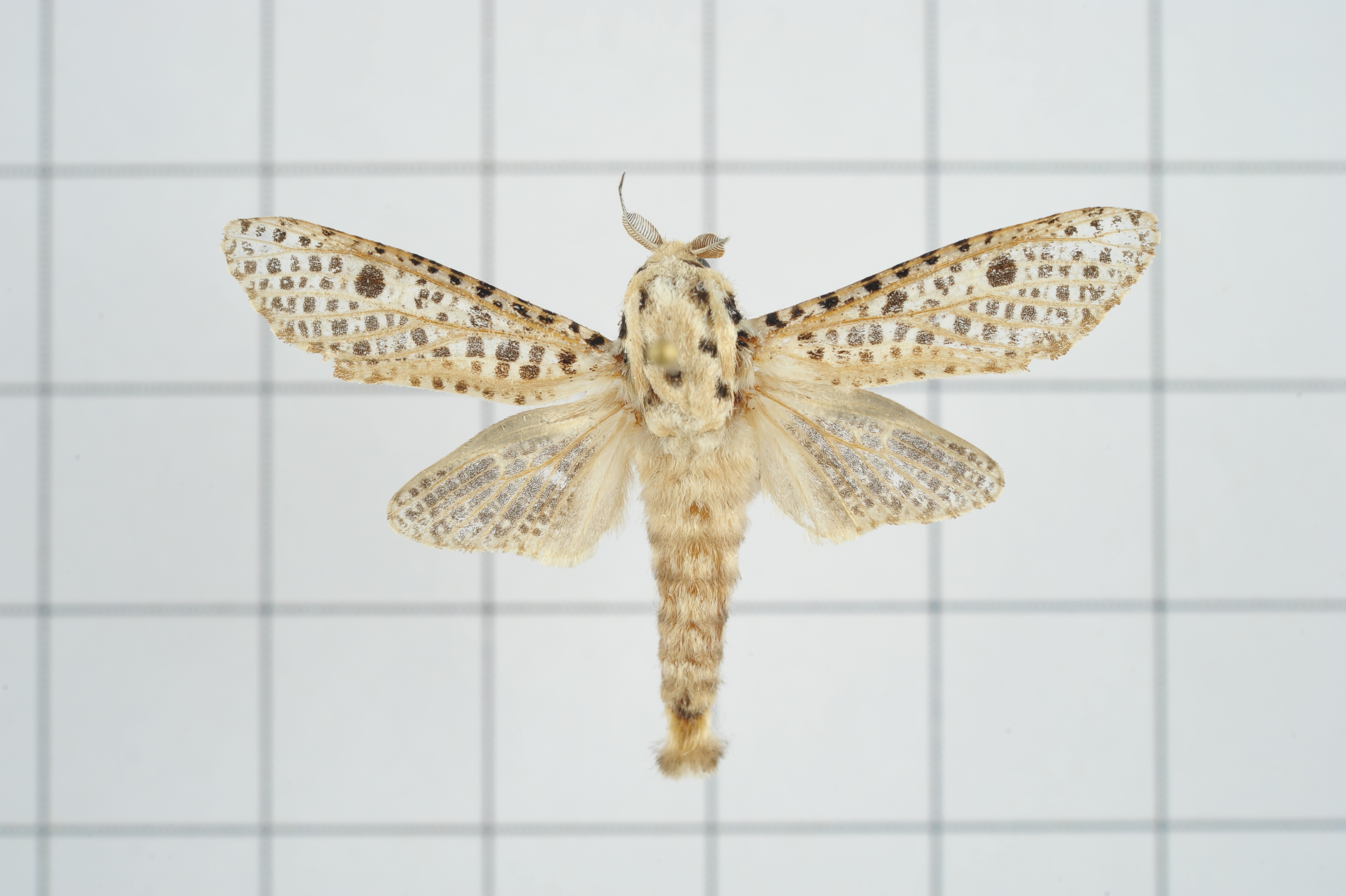

Scientific classification
- Domain: Eukaryota
- Kingdom: Animalia
- Phylum: Arthropoda
- Class: Insecta
- Order: Lepidoptera
- Family: Cossidae
- Genus: Rapdalus
- Species: R. pardicolor

Binomial name
- Rapdalus pardicolor (Moore, 1879)

Synonyms
- Zenzera pardicolor Moore, 1879; Zeuzera pardicolor; Duomitus pardalis Dudgeon, 1899; Zeuzera unimaculosa Matsumura, 1931

= Rapdalus pardicolor =

Species of moth

Rapdalus pardicolor is a moth in the family Cossidae. It was described by Frederic Moore in 1879. It is found in Taiwan, India, Thailand and Laos.
