= Tarsozeuzera =

Scientific classification
- Kingdom: Animalia
- Phylum: Arthropoda
- Clade: Pancrustacea
- Class: Insecta
- Order: Lepidoptera
- Family: Cossidae
- Subfamily: Zeuzerinae
- Genus: Tarsozeuzera; Schoorl, 1990

Genus of moths

Tarsozeuzera is a genus of moths in the family Cossidae.

== Species ==
- Tarsozeuzera fuscipars (Hampson, 1892)
- Tarsozeuzera kochi (Semper, 1896-1902)
- Tarsozeuzera livingstoni Yakovlev, 2006
- Tarsozeuzera miklukhomaklayi Yakovlev, 2011
- Tarsozeuzera ustjuzhanini Yakovlev, 2011
- Tarsozeuzera vavizola Yakovlev, 2006

== Etymology ==
The genus name is derived from Greek tarsos (meaning foot) and the genus-name Zeuzera.
