= Butaya auko =

Scientific classification
- Kingdom: Animalia
- Phylum: Arthropoda
- Clade: Pancrustacea
- Class: Insecta
- Order: Lepidoptera
- Family: Cossidae
- Genus: Butaya
- Species: B. auko

Binomial name
- Butaya auko Yakovlev, 2014

Species of moth

Butaya auko is a species of moth of the family Cossidae. It is found in Vietnam.
