= Psychonoctua personalis =

Scientific classification
- Kingdom: Animalia
- Phylum: Arthropoda
- Class: Insecta
- Order: Lepidoptera
- Family: Cossidae
- Genus: Psychonoctua
- Species: P. personalis

Binomial name
- Psychonoctua personalis Grote, 1865

Synonyms
- Xyleutes personalis; Duomitus jamaicensis Schaus, 1901; Psychonoctua lillianae Lindsey, 1926; Xyleutes muricolora Dyar, 1937

Species of moth

Psychonoctua personalis is a moth in the family Cossidae. It was described by Augustus Radcliffe Grote in 1865. It is found on Cuba, Jamaica, Hispaniola and Puerto Rico.

== Subspecies ==
- Psychonoctua personalis personalis
- Psychonoctua personalis jamaicensis (Schaus, 1901) (Jamaica)
- Psychonoctua personalis lillianae Lindsey, 1926 (Antigua)
- Psychonoctua personalis muricolora (Dyar, 1937) (Puerto Rico)
