= Neurozerra flavicera =

Scientific classification
- Kingdom: Animalia
- Phylum: Arthropoda
- Clade: Pancrustacea
- Class: Insecta
- Order: Lepidoptera
- Family: Cossidae
- Genus: Neurozerra
- Species: N. flavicera

Binomial name
- Neurozerra flavicera (Hua, Chou, Fang et Chen, 1990)

Synonyms
- Zeuzera flavicera Hua, Chou, Fang et Chen, 1990

Species of moth

Neurozerra flavicera is a moth in the family Cossidae. It was described by Hua, Chou, Fang and Chen in 1990. It is found in China (Guangdong).
