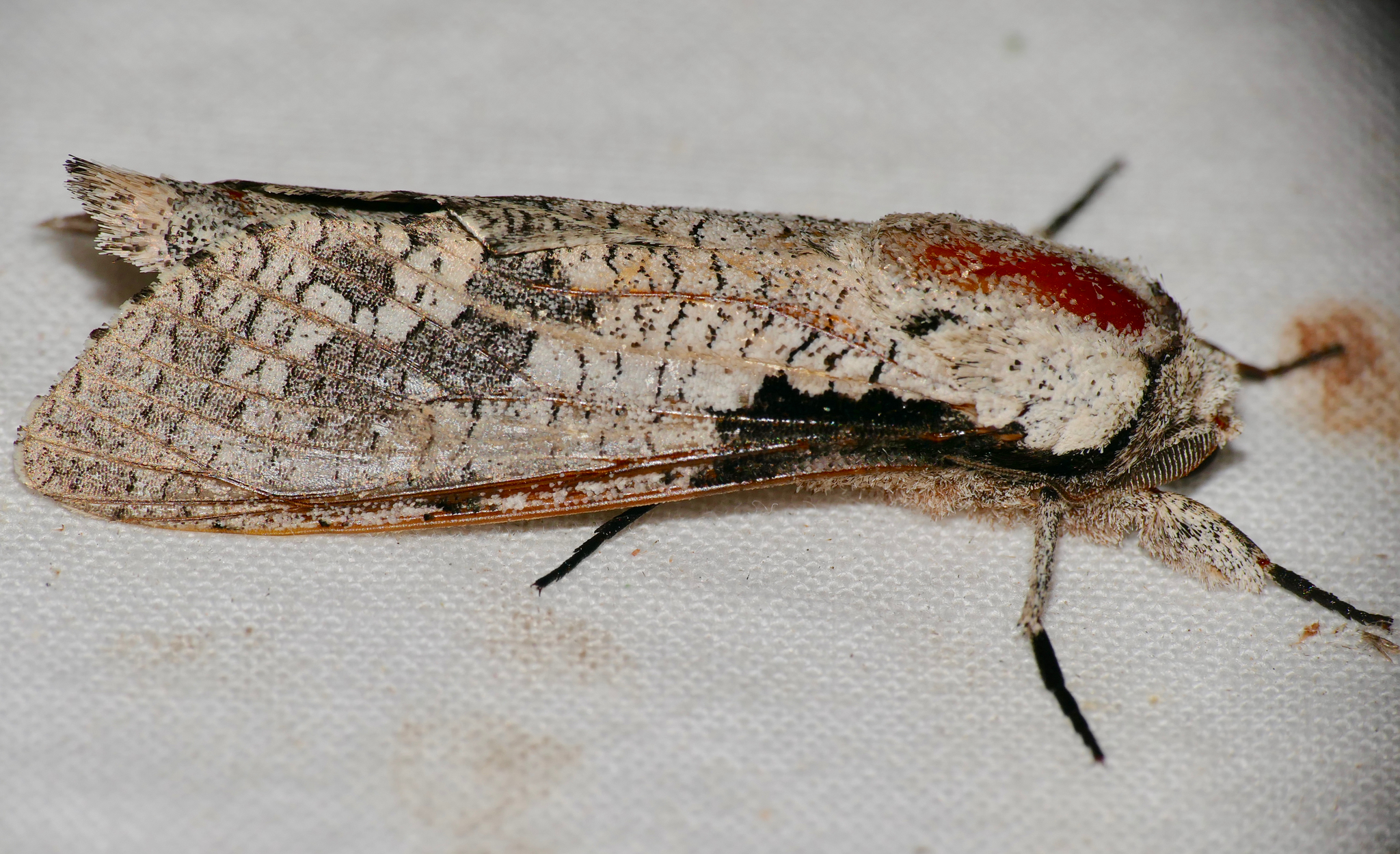

Scientific classification
- Kingdom: Animalia
- Phylum: Arthropoda
- Class: Insecta
- Order: Lepidoptera
- Family: Cossidae
- Genus: Aethalopteryx
- Species: A. squameus

Binomial name
- Aethalopteryx squameus (Distant, 1902)

Synonyms
- Duomitus squameus Distant, 1902; Aethalopteryx sameus; Azygophleps atriplaga Le Cerf, 1919

= Aethalopteryx squameus =

Species of moth

Aethalopteryx squameus is a moth in the family Cossidae. It is found in South Africa, Botswana, Mozambique, Malawi, Ghana, Angola and Tanzania.
