= Brevicyttara =

Scientific classification
- Kingdom: Animalia
- Phylum: Arthropoda
- Class: Insecta
- Order: Lepidoptera
- Family: Cossidae
- Subfamily: Zeuzerinae
- Genus: Brevicyttara; D. S. Fletcher & Nye, 1982
- Species: B. cyclospila

Binomial name
- Brevicyttara cyclospila (Turner, 1945)

Synonyms
- Brachycyttara Turner, 1945; Brachycyttara cyclospila Turner, 1945

Genus of moths

Brevicyttara is a monotypic moth genus in the family Cossidae described by David Stephen Fletcher and I. W. B Nye in 1982. Its only species, Brevicyttara cyclospila, described by Alfred Jefferis Turner in 1945, is found in Australia, where it has been recorded from Western Australia.

The wingspan is from 20 to 40 mm. The forewings are brown with dark areas at the base and a dark spot near the middle of the wing.
