= Aethalopteryx forsteri =

Scientific classification
- Kingdom: Animalia
- Phylum: Arthropoda
- Clade: Pancrustacea
- Class: Insecta
- Order: Lepidoptera
- Family: Cossidae
- Genus: Aethalopteryx
- Species: A. forsteri

Binomial name
- Aethalopteryx forsteri (Clench, 1959)

Synonyms
- Xyleutes forsteri Clench, 1959

Species of moth

Aethalopteryx forsteri is a moth in the family Cossidae. It is found in south-western Africa, including Namibia and South Africa.
