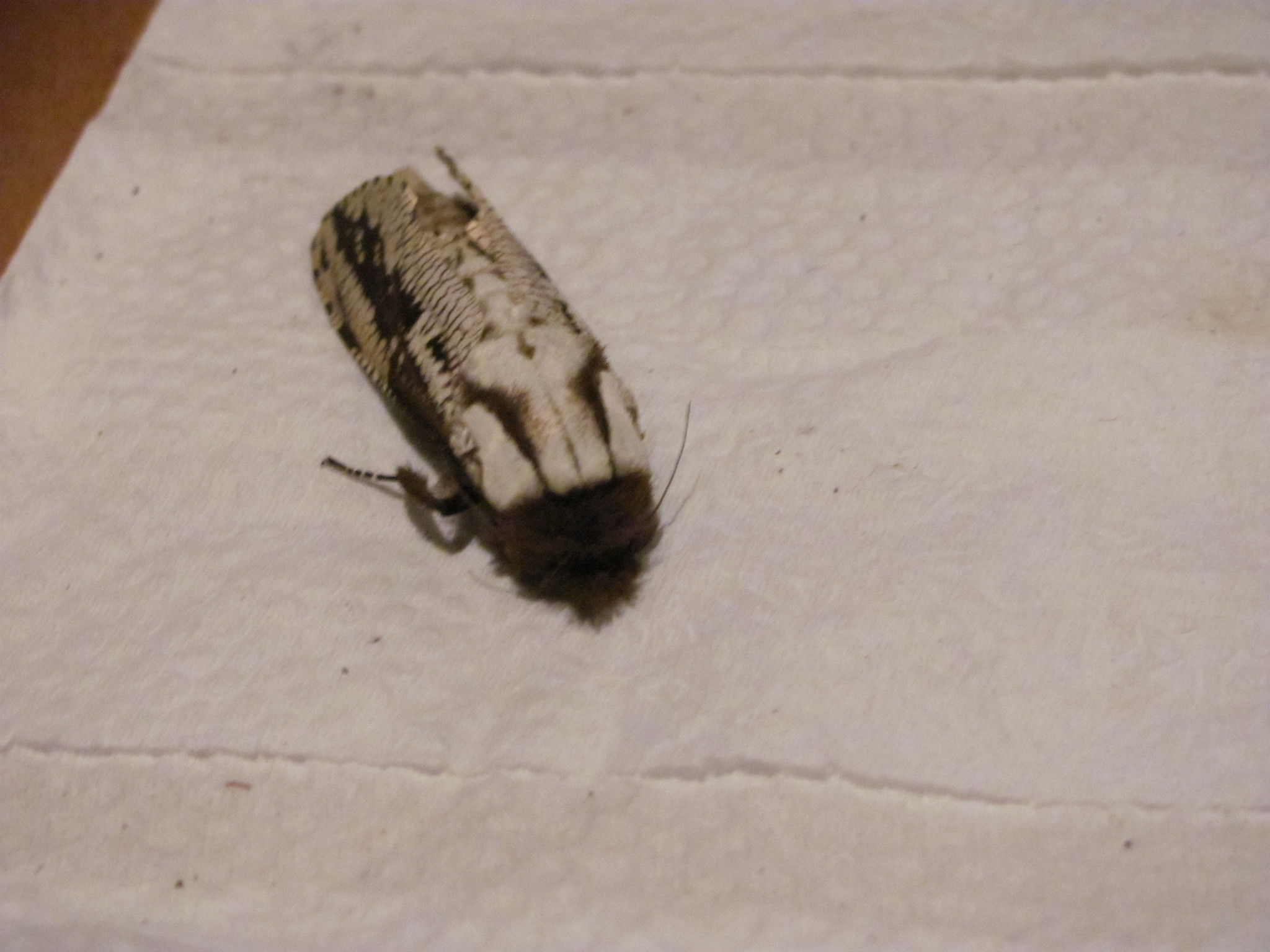
- Morpheis pyracmon

Scientific classification
- Kingdom: Animalia
- Phylum: Arthropoda
- Class: Insecta
- Order: Lepidoptera
- Family: Cossidae
- Genus: Morpheis
- Species: M. pyracmon

Binomial name
- Morpheis pyracmon (Cramer, 1780)

Synonyms
- Sphinx pyracmon Cramer, 1780; Zeuzera fracta Walker, 1856; Cossus palmarum Herrich-Schäffer, 1853; Zeuzera putrida Percheron, 1838; Duomitus pyracmonides Schaus, 1901

= Morpheis pyracmon =

Species of moth

Morpheis pyracmon, the fissured bark, is a moth in the family Cossidae. It was described by Pieter Cramer in 1780. It is found in Suriname, Venezuela, Ecuador and Peru. The habitat consists of cloudforests, where it is found at altitudes between 400 and 1,200 meters.
