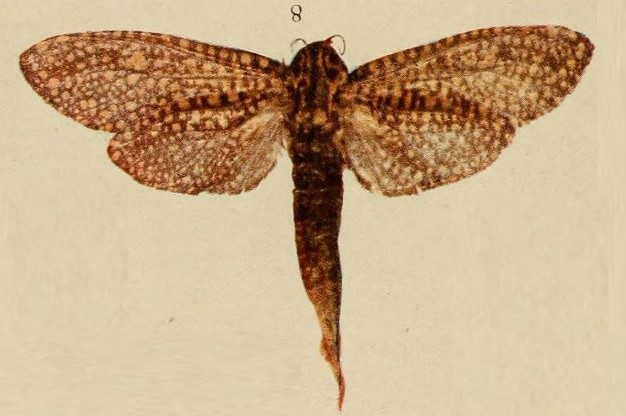

Scientific classification
- Kingdom: Animalia
- Phylum: Arthropoda
- Clade: Pancrustacea
- Class: Insecta
- Order: Lepidoptera
- Family: Cossidae
- Subfamily: Zeuzerinae
- Genus: Alophonotus; Schoorl, 1990
- Species: A. rauana

Binomial name
- Alophonotus rauana (Strand, 1909)

Synonyms
- Chalcidica (Duomitus) rauana Strand, 1909; Callocossus langi Holland, 1920

= Alophonotus =

Monotypic moth genus in family Cossidae

Alophonotus is a monotypic moth genus in the family Cossidae. Alophonotus rauana, the sole species in the genus, is found in the Democratic Republic of Congo, Malawi, Senegal, South Africa, South Sudan, Tanzania, Uganda and Zimbabwe.
