= Psychonoctua nullifer =

Scientific classification
- Kingdom: Animalia
- Phylum: Arthropoda
- Class: Insecta
- Order: Lepidoptera
- Family: Cossidae
- Genus: Psychonoctua
- Species: P. nullifer

Binomial name
- Psychonoctua nullifer Dyar, 1914

Species of moth

Psychonoctua nullifer is a moth in the family Cossidae. It was described by Harrison Gray Dyar Jr. in 1914. It is found in Panama. It was described from Tobago Island.
