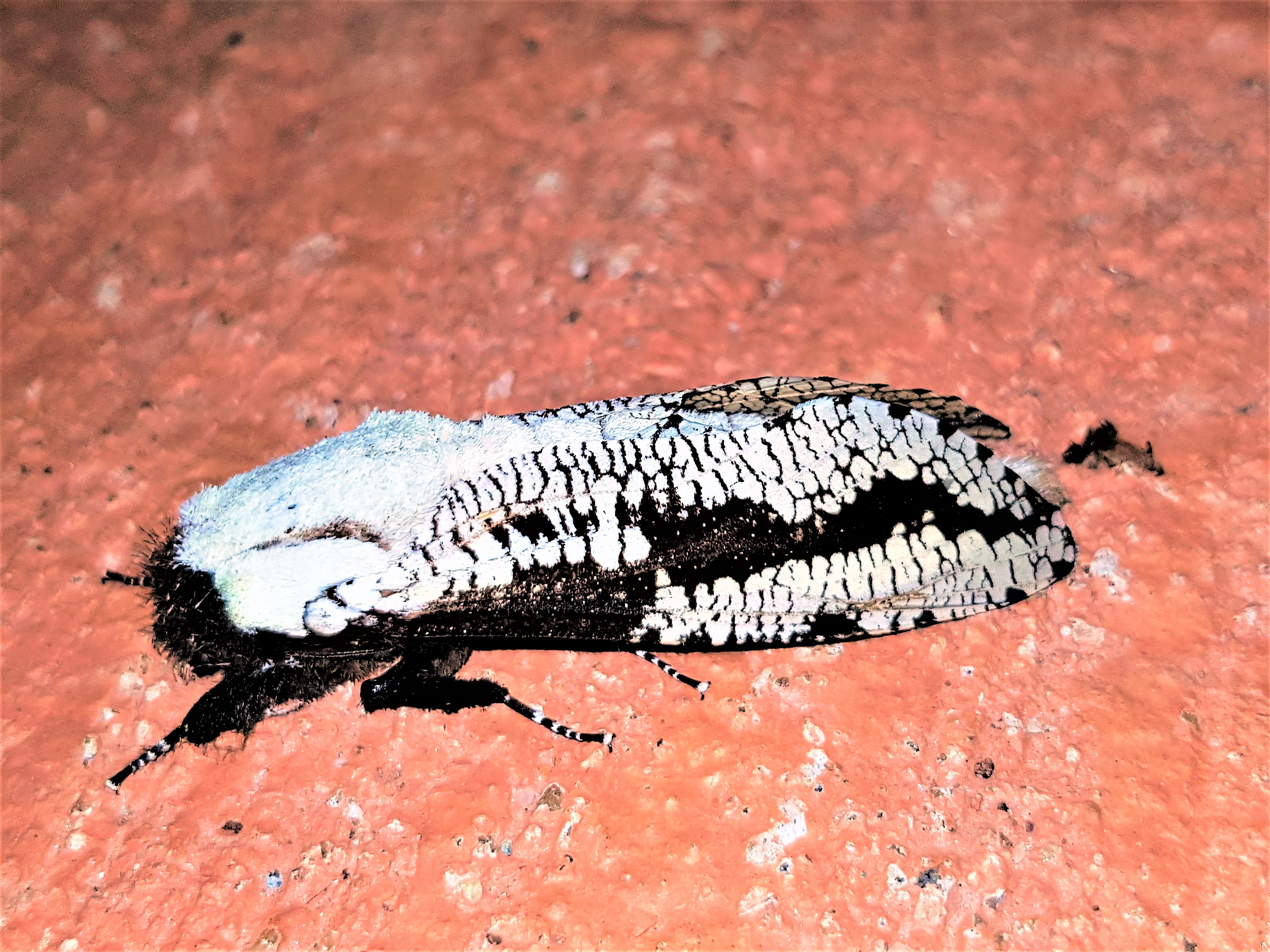
- Morpheis pyracmon

Scientific classification
- Kingdom: Animalia
- Phylum: Arthropoda
- Clade: Pancrustacea
- Class: Insecta
- Order: Lepidoptera
- Family: Cossidae
- Subfamily: Zeuzerinae
- Genus: Morpheis; Hübner, 1820

Synonyms
- Neocossus Houlbert, 1916; Xylotrypa Turner, 1918

= Morpheis =

Genus of moths

Morpheis is a genus of moths in the family Cossidae.

== Species ==
- Morpheis clenchi Donahue, 1980
- Morpheis cognata Walker, 1856
- Morpheis comisteon Schaus, 1911
- Morpheis discreta Dyar, 1937
- Morpheis impedita Wallengren, 1860
- Morpheis lelex Dognin, 1891
- Morpheis mathani Schaus, 1901
- Morpheis melanoleuca Burmeister, 1878
- Morpheis pyracmon Cramer, 1780
- Morpheis strigillata Felder, 1874
- Morpheis votani Schaus, 1934
- Morpheis xylotribus Herrich-Schäffer, 1853
