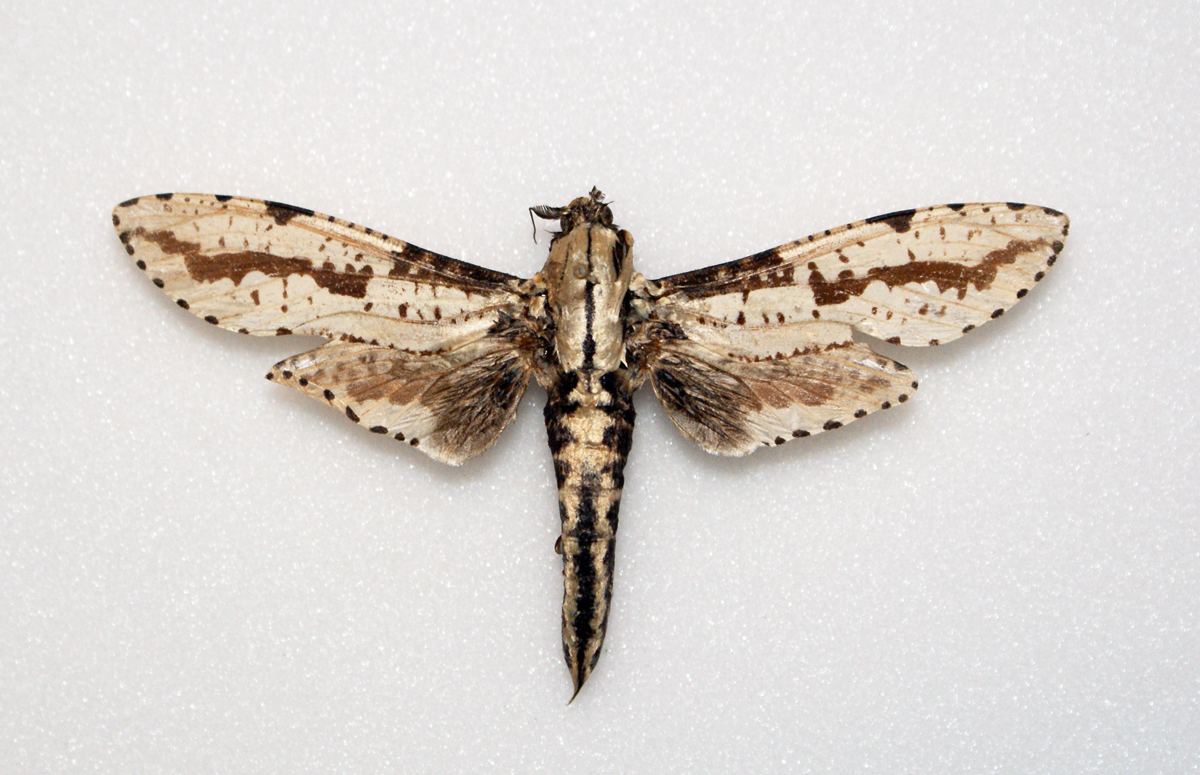
- Morpheis mathani

Scientific classification
- Kingdom: Animalia
- Phylum: Arthropoda
- Class: Insecta
- Order: Lepidoptera
- Family: Cossidae
- Genus: Morpheis
- Species: M. mathani

Binomial name
- Morpheis mathani (Schaus, 1901)

Synonyms
- Duomitus mathani Schaus, 1901; Xyleutes cognatus distincta Bryk, 1953; Xyleutes oberthueri Houlbert, 1916

= Morpheis mathani =

Species of moth

Morpheis mathani is a moth in the family Cossidae. It was described by Schaus in 1901. It is found from Mexico to Brazil and Peru.
