= Chalcidica pallescens =

Scientific classification
- Domain: Eukaryota
- Kingdom: Animalia
- Phylum: Arthropoda
- Class: Insecta
- Order: Lepidoptera
- Family: Cossidae
- Genus: Chalcidica
- Species: C. pallescens

Binomial name
- Chalcidica pallescens (Roepke, 1955)

Synonyms
- Xyleutes mineus pallescens Roepke, 1955; Xyleutes mineus pallescens f. archboldi Roepke, 1955

Species of moth

Chalcidica pallescens is a moth in the family Cossidae. It was described by Roepke in 1955. It is found in New Guinea and on the Solomon Islands.
