= Strigocossus elephas =

Scientific classification
- Kingdom: Animalia
- Phylum: Arthropoda
- Clade: Pancrustacea
- Class: Insecta
- Order: Lepidoptera
- Family: Cossidae
- Genus: Strigocossus
- Species: S. elephas

Binomial name
- Strigocossus elephas Yakovlev, 2013

Species of moth

Strigocossus elephas is a moth in the family Cossidae. It is found in Malawi, South Africa (KwaZulu-Natal), Eswatini and Uganda.
