= Strigocossus cretacea =

Scientific classification
- Domain: Eukaryota
- Kingdom: Animalia
- Phylum: Arthropoda
- Class: Insecta
- Order: Lepidoptera
- Family: Cossidae
- Genus: Strigocossus
- Species: S. cretacea

Binomial name
- Strigocossus cretacea (Butler, 1878)

Synonyms
- Zenzera cretacea Butler, 1878; Zeuzera cretacea; Xyleutes malgacica Houlbert, 1916

Species of moth

Strigocossus cretacea is a moth in the family Cossidae. It is found in Madagascar.
