= Strigocossus hepialoides =

Scientific classification
- Kingdom: Animalia
- Phylum: Arthropoda
- Clade: Pancrustacea
- Class: Insecta
- Order: Lepidoptera
- Family: Cossidae
- Genus: Strigocossus
- Species: S. hepialoides

Binomial name
- Strigocossus hepialoides Yakovlev, 2011

Species of moth

Strigocossus hepialoides is a moth in the family Cossidae. It was described by Yakovlev in 2011. It is found in Tanzania. Most larvae live in the soil. Adults may be attracted to artificial light.
