= Carohamilia lineaplena =

Scientific classification
- Domain: Eukaryota
- Kingdom: Animalia
- Phylum: Arthropoda
- Class: Insecta
- Order: Lepidoptera
- Family: Cossidae
- Genus: Carohamilia
- Species: C. lineaplena

Binomial name
- Carohamilia lineaplena (Dognin, 1911)

Synonyms
- Givira lineaplena Dognin, 1911

Species of moth

Carohamilia lineaplena is a moth in the family Cossidae. It is found in French Guiana.
