= Neurozerra roricyanea =

Scientific classification
- Kingdom: Animalia
- Phylum: Arthropoda
- Class: Insecta
- Order: Lepidoptera
- Family: Cossidae
- Genus: Neurozerra
- Species: N. roricyanea

Binomial name
- Neurozerra roricyanea (Walker, 1862)

Synonyms
- Zeuzera roricyanea Walker, 1862; Zeuzera neuropunctata Gaede, 1933

Species of moth

Neurozerra roricyanea is a moth in the family Cossidae. It was described by Francis Walker in 1862. It is found in Malaysia and New Guinea.
