= Strigocossus ochricosta =

Scientific classification
- Domain: Eukaryota
- Kingdom: Animalia
- Phylum: Arthropoda
- Class: Insecta
- Order: Lepidoptera
- Family: Cossidae
- Genus: Strigocossus
- Species: S. ochricosta

Binomial name
- Strigocossus ochricosta (D. S. Fletcher, 1968)

Synonyms
- Azygophleps ochricosta D. S. Fletcher, 1968

Species of moth

Strigocossus ochricosta is a moth in the family Cossidae. It was described by David Stephen Fletcher in 1968. It is found in Botswana, the Democratic Republic of the Congo, Guinea, Kenya, Malawi, Rwanda, South Africa, Tanzania, Uganda and Zimbabwe.
