= Rugigegat nigra =

Scientific classification
- Domain: Eukaryota
- Kingdom: Animalia
- Phylum: Arthropoda
- Class: Insecta
- Order: Lepidoptera
- Family: Cossidae
- Genus: Rugigegat
- Species: R. nigra

Binomial name
- Rugigegat nigra (Moore, 1877)

Synonyms
- Zeuzera nigra Moore, 1877

Species of moth

Rugigegat nigra is a moth in the family Cossidae. It was described by Frederic Moore in 1877. It is found in Sri Lanka.
