= Bergaris jacobsoni =

Scientific classification
- Domain: Eukaryota
- Kingdom: Animalia
- Phylum: Arthropoda
- Class: Insecta
- Order: Lepidoptera
- Family: Cossidae
- Genus: Bergaris
- Species: B. jacobsoni

Binomial name
- Bergaris jacobsoni (Roepke, 1957)

Synonyms
- Xyleutes jacobsoni Roepke, 1957

Species of moth

Bergaris jacobsoni is a species of moth of the family Cossidae. It is found on the Southeast Asian islands of Sumatra and Borneo.
