= Pseudozeuzera =

Scientific classification
- Kingdom: Animalia
- Phylum: Arthropoda
- Clade: Pancrustacea
- Class: Insecta
- Order: Lepidoptera
- Family: Cossidae
- Subfamily: Zeuzerinae
- Genus: Pseudozeuzera; Schoorl, 1990

Genus of moths

Pseudozeuzera is a genus of moths in the family Cossidae.

== Species ==
- Pseudozeuzera biatra (Hampson, 1910)
- Pseudozeuzera stenlii Yakovlev, 2009
