= Brypoctia =

Scientific classification
- Kingdom: Animalia
- Phylum: Arthropoda
- Clade: Pancrustacea
- Class: Insecta
- Order: Lepidoptera
- Family: Cossidae
- Subfamily: Zeuzerinae
- Genus: Brypoctia; Schoorl, 1990

Species
- Brypoctia eqaqo Yakovlev, Penco & Witt, 2019; Brypoctia greifensteini Yakovlev, Penco & Witt, 2019; Brypoctia itzamna Yakovlev, Penco & Witt, 2019; Brypoctia kurupi Yakovlev, Penco & Witt, 2019; Brypoctia monai Yakovlev, Penco & Witt, 2019; Brypoctia punctifer (Hampson, 1898); Brypoctia strigifer (Dyar, 1910)

Genus of moths

Brypoctia is a genus of moths in the Cossidae family.
