= Yakovlevina galina =

Scientific classification
- Kingdom: Animalia
- Phylum: Arthropoda
- Clade: Pancrustacea
- Class: Insecta
- Order: Lepidoptera
- Family: Cossidae
- Genus: Yakovlevina
- Species: Y. galina

Binomial name
- Yakovlevina galina (Yakovlev, 2004)

Synonyms
- Garuda galina Yakovlev, 2004

Species of moth

Yakovlevina galina is a species of moth of the family Cossidae. It is found in Yunnan, China.
