= Chalcidica =

Scientific classification
- Kingdom: Animalia
- Phylum: Arthropoda
- Clade: Pancrustacea
- Class: Insecta
- Order: Lepidoptera
- Family: Cossidae
- Subfamily: Zeuzerinae
- Tribe: Xyleutini
- Genus: Chalcidica; Hübner, [1820]

Genus of moths

Chalcidica is a genus of moths in the family Cossidae.

== Species ==
- Chalcidica maculescens Yakovlev, 2011
- Chalcidica mineus (Cramer, 1779)
- Chalcidica pallescens (Roepke, 1955)
