= Panau stenoptera =

Scientific classification
- Domain: Eukaryota
- Kingdom: Animalia
- Phylum: Arthropoda
- Class: Insecta
- Order: Lepidoptera
- Family: Cossidae
- Genus: Panau
- Species: P. stenoptera

Binomial name
- Panau stenoptera (Roepke, 1957)

Synonyms
- Xyleutes stenoptera Roepke, 1957; Xyleutes stenoptera sumatrana Roepke, 1957

Species of moth

Panau stenoptera is a moth in the family Cossidae. It was described by Roepke in 1957. It is found in Vietnam and Malaysia and on Sumatra, Java and the Andaman Islands.

== Subspecies ==
- Panau stenoptera stenoptera
- Panau stenoptera sumatrana (Roepke, 1957) (Sumatra, Vietnam)
