= Morpheis impedita =

Scientific classification
- Kingdom: Animalia
- Phylum: Arthropoda
- Class: Insecta
- Order: Lepidoptera
- Family: Cossidae
- Genus: Morpheis
- Species: M. impedita

Binomial name
- Morpheis impedita (Wallengren, 1860)

Synonyms
- Phragmataecia impedita Wallengren, 1860

Species of moth

Morpheis impedita is a moth in the family Cossidae. It was described by Wallengren in 1860. It is found in South America.
