= Bergaris solovievi =

Scientific classification
- Kingdom: Animalia
- Phylum: Arthropoda
- Clade: Pancrustacea
- Class: Insecta
- Order: Lepidoptera
- Family: Cossidae
- Genus: Bergaris
- Species: B. solovievi

Binomial name
- Bergaris solovievi Yakovlev, 2011

Species of moth

Bergaris solovievi is a species of moth of the family Cossidae. It is found in Vietnam.
