= Tarsozeuzera kochi =

Scientific classification
- Domain: Eukaryota
- Kingdom: Animalia
- Phylum: Arthropoda
- Class: Insecta
- Order: Lepidoptera
- Family: Cossidae
- Genus: Tarsozeuzera
- Species: T. kochi

Binomial name
- Tarsozeuzera kochi (Semper, 1896-1902)

Synonyms
- Zeuzera kochi Semper, 1896-1902

Species of moth

Tarsozeuzera kochi is a moth in the family Cossidae. It was described by Georg Semper in 1896–1902. It is found in the Philippines.
