= Morpheis comisteon =

Scientific classification
- Kingdom: Animalia
- Phylum: Arthropoda
- Class: Insecta
- Order: Lepidoptera
- Family: Cossidae
- Genus: Morpheis
- Species: M. comisteon

Binomial name
- Morpheis comisteon (Schaus, 1911)

Synonyms
- Zeuzera comisteon Schaus, 1911

Species of moth

Morpheis comisteon is a moth in the family Cossidae. It was described by William Schaus in 1911. It is found in Costa Rica.
