= Cecryphalus nubila =

Scientific classification
- Kingdom: Animalia
- Phylum: Arthropoda
- Class: Insecta
- Order: Lepidoptera
- Family: Cossidae
- Genus: Cecryphalus
- Species: C. nubila

Binomial name
- Cecryphalus nubila (Staudinger, 1895)

Synonyms
- Zeuzera nubila Staudinger, 1895; Zeuzera strix Grum-Grshimailo, 1895; Zeuzera speyeri Austaut, 1897; Zeuzera nubila babadzhanidii Sheljuzhko, 1913

Species of moth

Cecryphalus nubila is a moth in the family Cossidae. It is found in Mongolia, Turkey, Armenia, Kazakhstan, Kyrgyzstan, Uzbekistan, Tajikistan, Azerbaijan, Turkmenistan, southern Iran and China.
