= Yakovlevina =

Scientific classification
- Domain: Eukaryota
- Kingdom: Animalia
- Phylum: Arthropoda
- Class: Insecta
- Order: Lepidoptera
- Family: Cossidae
- Subfamily: Zeuzerinae
- Genus: Yakovlevina; Kemal & Koçak, 2005

Synonyms
- Garuda Yakovlev, 2005 (nec Scherer, 1969)

Genus of moths

Yakovlevina is a genus of moths in the family Cossidae.

== Species ==
- Yakovlevina albostriata (Yakovlev, 2006)
- Yakovlevina galina (Yakovlev, 2004)
