= Morpheis votani =

Scientific classification
- Kingdom: Animalia
- Phylum: Arthropoda
- Class: Insecta
- Order: Lepidoptera
- Family: Cossidae
- Genus: Morpheis
- Species: M. votani

Binomial name
- Morpheis votani (Schaus, 1934)

Synonyms
- Xyleutes votani Schaus, 1934

Species of moth

Morpheis votani is a moth in the family Cossidae. It was described by Schaus in 1934. It is found in Argentina.
