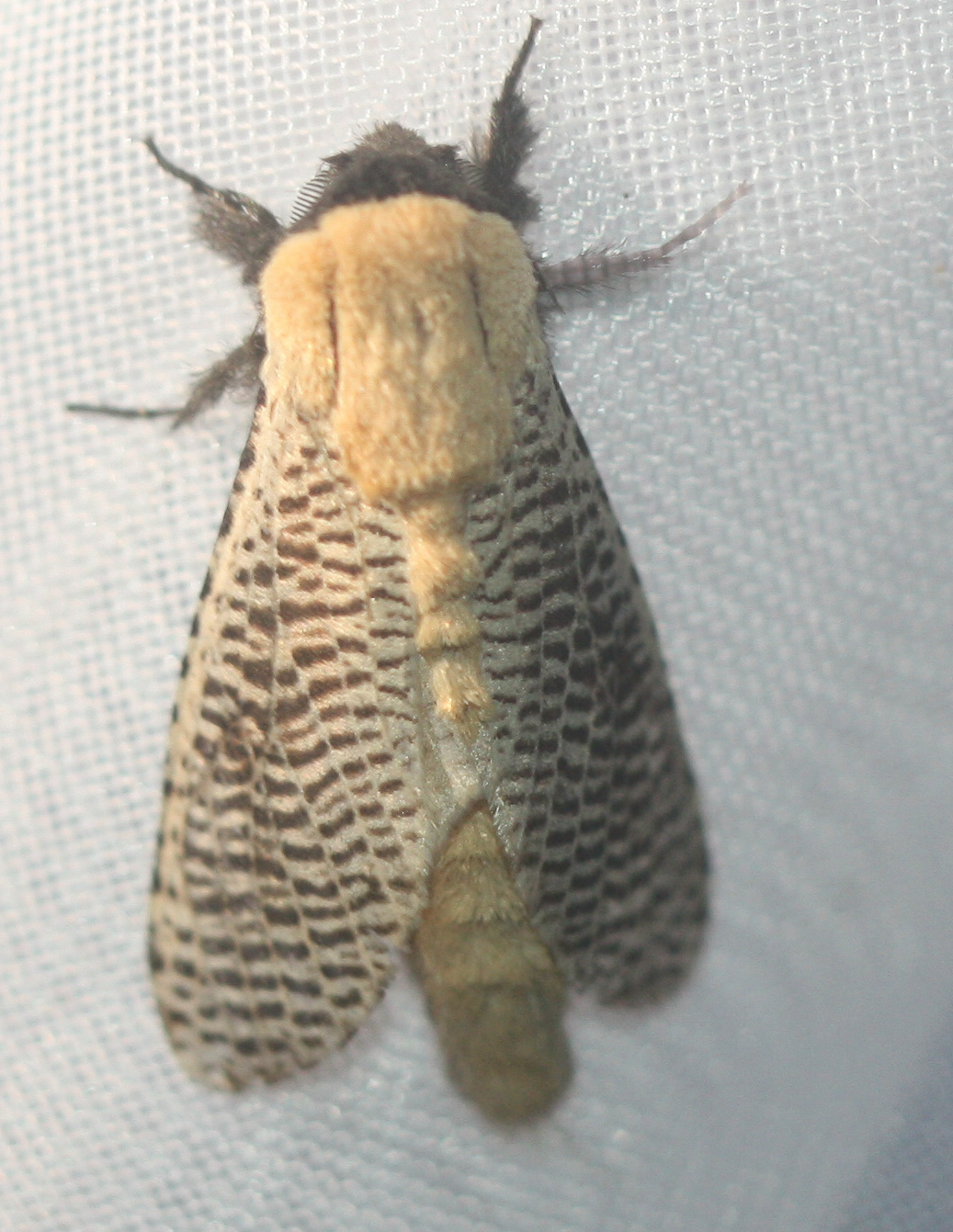

Scientific classification
- Domain: Eukaryota
- Kingdom: Animalia
- Phylum: Arthropoda
- Class: Insecta
- Order: Lepidoptera
- Family: Cossidae
- Genus: Brypoctia
- Species: B. strigifer

Binomial name
- Brypoctia strigifer (Dyar, 1910)

Synonyms
- Xyleutes strigifer Dyar, 1910; Morpheis strigifer

= Brypoctia strigifer =

Genus of moths

Brypoctia strigifer is a species of moth in the Brypoctia genus in the family Cossidae. It is found in Mexico, Costa Rica, Honduras, Guatemala and Colombia.
