= Pseudozeuzera biatra =

Scientific classification
- Kingdom: Animalia
- Phylum: Arthropoda
- Class: Insecta
- Order: Lepidoptera
- Family: Cossidae
- Genus: Pseudozeuzera
- Species: P. biatra

Binomial name
- Pseudozeuzera biatra (Hampson, 1910)

Synonyms
- Duomitus biatra Hampson, 1910

Species of moth

Pseudozeuzera biatra is a moth in the family Cossidae. It was described by George Hampson in 1910. It is found in Ghana, Nigeria, Sierra Leone and Uganda.
