= Strigocossus mediopallens =

Scientific classification
- Domain: Eukaryota
- Kingdom: Animalia
- Phylum: Arthropoda
- Class: Insecta
- Order: Lepidoptera
- Family: Cossidae
- Genus: Strigocossus
- Species: S. mediopallens

Binomial name
- Strigocossus mediopallens (D. S. Fletcher, 1968)

Synonyms
- Azygophleps mediopallens D. S. Fletcher, 1968

Species of moth

Strigocossus mediopallens is a moth in the family Cossidae. It was described by David Stephen Fletcher in 1968. It is found in Ethiopia and Uganda.
