= Zeuroepkia =

Scientific classification
- Kingdom: Animalia
- Phylum: Arthropoda
- Clade: Pancrustacea
- Class: Insecta
- Order: Lepidoptera
- Family: Cossidae
- Subfamily: Zeuzerinae
- Genus: Zeuroepkia; Yakovlev, 2011
- Species: Z. borneana

Binomial name
- Zeuroepkia borneana (Roepke, 1957)

Synonyms
- Zeuzera borneana Roepke, 1957

Genus of moths

Zeuroepkia is a genus of moths in the family Cossidae. It contains only one species, Zeuroepkia borneana, which is found on Borneo. Its habitat consists of alluvial forests, lowland limestone forests and upper montane forests.
