= Panau borealis =

Scientific classification
- Kingdom: Animalia
- Phylum: Arthropoda
- Clade: Pancrustacea
- Class: Insecta
- Order: Lepidoptera
- Family: Cossidae
- Genus: Panau
- Species: P. borealis

Binomial name
- Panau borealis Yakovlev, 2004

Species of moth

Panau borealis is a moth in the family Cossidae. It was described by Yakovlev in 2004. It is found in China (Yunnan).
