= Aethalopteryx sulaki =

Scientific classification
- Kingdom: Animalia
- Phylum: Arthropoda
- Clade: Pancrustacea
- Class: Insecta
- Order: Lepidoptera
- Family: Cossidae
- Genus: Aethalopteryx
- Species: A. sulaki

Binomial name
- Aethalopteryx sulaki Yakovlev, 2011

Species of moth

Aethalopteryx sulaki is a moth in the family Cossidae. It is found in Kenya.
