= Voousia =

Scientific classification
- Kingdom: Animalia
- Phylum: Arthropoda
- Clade: Pancrustacea
- Class: Insecta
- Order: Lepidoptera
- Family: Cossidae
- Subfamily: Zeuzerinae
- Genus: Voousia; Schoorl, 1990
- Species: V. punctifer

Binomial name
- Voousia punctifer (Hampson, 1898)

Synonyms
- Duomitus punctifer Hampson, 1898; Xyleutes punctifer

Species of moth

Voousia punctifer is a moth in the family Cossidae, and the only species in the genus Voousia. It is found on Grenada, Dominica, St. Lucia and St. Vincent.

== Etymology ==
The genus is named in honour of Prof. Dr. K . H . Voous.
