= Tarsozeuzera fuscipars =

Scientific classification
- Kingdom: Animalia
- Phylum: Arthropoda
- Class: Insecta
- Order: Lepidoptera
- Family: Cossidae
- Genus: Tarsozeuzera
- Species: T. fuscipars

Binomial name
- Tarsozeuzera fuscipars (Hampson, 1892)

Synonyms
- Duomitus fuscipars Hampson, 1892; Xyleutes xanthitarsus Hua, Chou, Fang & Chen, 1990; Tarsozeuzera fuscipans Yakovlev, 2004

Species of moth

Tarsozeuzera fuscipars is a moth in the family Cossidae. It was described by George Hampson in 1892. It is found in southern India, Malaysia, Borneo, Vietnam, Thailand and Yunnan, China.
