= Sinjaeviella =

Scientific classification
- Kingdom: Animalia
- Phylum: Arthropoda
- Clade: Pancrustacea
- Class: Insecta
- Order: Lepidoptera
- Family: Cossidae
- Subfamily: Zeuzerinae
- Genus: Sinjaeviella; Yakovlev, 2009

Genus of moths

Sinjaeviella is a genus of moths in the family Cossidae.

== Species ==
- Sinjaeviella elegantissima Yakovlev, 2009
- Sinjaeviella renatae Yakovlev, 2011
