= Morpheis strigillata =

Scientific classification
- Kingdom: Animalia
- Phylum: Arthropoda
- Class: Insecta
- Order: Lepidoptera
- Family: Cossidae
- Genus: Morpheis
- Species: M. strigillata

Binomial name
- Morpheis strigillata (Felder, 1874)

Synonyms
- Endoxyla strigillata Felder, 1874

Species of moth

Morpheis strigillata is a moth in the family Cossidae. It was described by Felder in 1874. It is found in Argentina.
