= Relluna =

Scientific classification
- Kingdom: Animalia
- Phylum: Arthropoda
- Clade: Pancrustacea
- Class: Insecta
- Order: Lepidoptera
- Family: Cossidae
- Subfamily: Zeuzerinae
- Genus: Relluna; Schoorl, 1990
- Species: R. nurella

Binomial name
- Relluna nurella (Swinhoe, 1894)

Synonyms
- Azygophleps nurella Swinhoe, 1894

Species of moth

Relluna nurella is a moth in the family Cossidae, and the only species in the genus Relluna. It is found in the north-eastern Himalayas, as well as on Peninsular Malaysia, Borneo and Palawan.

The forewings and hindwings are uniform brownish fawn, except for a pale yellow area along the dorsum of the forewings.

== Subspecies ==
- Relluna nurella nurella
- Relluna nurella wallacei Yakovlev, 2008 (Myanmar, Malaysia, Borneo, Sumatra)

== Etymology ==
The genus name is an anagram of the species-name nurella.
