= Aethalopteryx obscurascens =

Scientific classification
- Domain: Eukaryota
- Kingdom: Animalia
- Phylum: Arthropoda
- Class: Insecta
- Order: Lepidoptera
- Family: Cossidae
- Genus: Aethalopteryx
- Species: A. obscurascens

Binomial name
- Aethalopteryx obscurascens (Gaede, 1930)

Synonyms
- Xyleutes obscurascens Gaede, 1930

Species of moth

Aethalopteryx obscurascens is a moth in the family Cossidae. It is found in Ethiopia.
