= Yakovlevina albostriata =

Scientific classification
- Kingdom: Animalia
- Phylum: Arthropoda
- Class: Insecta
- Order: Lepidoptera
- Family: Cossidae
- Genus: Yakovlevina
- Species: Y. albostriata

Binomial name
- Yakovlevina albostriata (Yakovlev, 2006)

Synonyms
- Garuda albostriata Yakovlev, 2006

Species of moth

Yakovlevina albostriata is a moth in the family Cossidae. It was described by Yakovlev in 2006. It is found in Yunnan, China.

The length of the forewings is 17–19 mm for males and about 20 mm for females.
