= Pseudozeuzera stenlii =

Scientific classification
- Kingdom: Animalia
- Phylum: Arthropoda
- Clade: Pancrustacea
- Class: Insecta
- Order: Lepidoptera
- Family: Cossidae
- Genus: Pseudozeuzera
- Species: P. stenlii

Binomial name
- Pseudozeuzera stenlii Yakovlev, 2009

Species of moth

Pseudozeuzera stenlii is a moth in the family Cossidae. It was described by Yakovlev in 2009. It is found in the Democratic Republic of Congo.
