= Aethalopteryx pindarus =

Scientific classification
- Domain: Eukaryota
- Kingdom: Animalia
- Phylum: Arthropoda
- Class: Insecta
- Order: Lepidoptera
- Family: Cossidae
- Genus: Aethalopteryx
- Species: A. pindarus

Binomial name
- Aethalopteryx pindarus (Fawcett, 1916)

Synonyms
- Duomitus pindarus Fawcett, 1916; Aethalopteryx pindara

Species of moth

Aethalopteryx pindarus is a moth in the family Cossidae. It is found in Kenya, Uganda and South Africa.
