= Sinjaeviella renatae =

Scientific classification
- Kingdom: Animalia
- Phylum: Arthropoda
- Clade: Pancrustacea
- Class: Insecta
- Order: Lepidoptera
- Family: Cossidae
- Genus: Sinjaeviella
- Species: S. renatae

Binomial name
- Sinjaeviella renatae Yakovlev, 2011

Species of moth

Sinjaeviella renatae is a species of moth of the family Cossidae. It is found in Ghana.
