= Strigocossus ambahona =

Scientific classification
- Kingdom: Animalia
- Phylum: Arthropoda
- Class: Insecta
- Order: Lepidoptera
- Family: Cossidae
- Genus: Strigocossus
- Species: S. ambahona

Binomial name
- Strigocossus ambahona (Viette, 1954)

Synonyms
- Xylocossus cretacea ambahona Viette, 1954

Species of moth

Strigocossus ambahona is a moth in the family Cossidae. It is found in Madagascar.
