= Strigocossus moderata =

Scientific classification
- Kingdom: Animalia
- Phylum: Arthropoda
- Class: Insecta
- Order: Lepidoptera
- Family: Cossidae
- Genus: Strigocossus
- Species: S. moderata

Binomial name
- Strigocossus moderata (Walker, 1856)

Synonyms
- Zeuzera moderata Walker, 1856; Strigocossus moderatus; Xyleutes leucopteris Houlbert, 1916; Xyleutes sjoestedti vosseleri Gaede, 1930

Species of moth

Strigocossus moderata is a moth in the family Cossidae. It is found in Cameroon, Gabon, Kenya, Malawi, Mozambique, Sierra Leone, South Africa, Tanzania and Zambia.

The larvae feed on Cassia and Pterolobium species.
