= Strigocossus guillemei =

Scientific classification
- Domain: Eukaryota
- Kingdom: Animalia
- Phylum: Arthropoda
- Class: Insecta
- Order: Lepidoptera
- Family: Cossidae
- Genus: Strigocossus
- Species: S. guillemei

Binomial name
- Strigocossus guillemei (Houlbert, 1916)

Synonyms
- Xyleutes guillemei Houlbert, 1916

Species of moth

Strigocossus guillemei is a moth in the family Cossidae. It is found in the Democratic Republic of Congo.
