= Panau bretschneideri =

Scientific classification
- Kingdom: Animalia
- Phylum: Arthropoda
- Clade: Pancrustacea
- Class: Insecta
- Order: Lepidoptera
- Family: Cossidae
- Genus: Panau
- Species: P. bretschneideri

Binomial name
- Panau bretschneideri Yakovlev, 2013

Species of moth

Panau bretschneideri is a moth in the family Cossidae. It was described by Yakovlev in 2013. It is found in India (Arunachal Pradesh).
