= Bergaris flora =

Scientific classification
- Kingdom: Animalia
- Phylum: Arthropoda
- Clade: Pancrustacea
- Class: Insecta
- Order: Lepidoptera
- Family: Cossidae
- Genus: Bergaris
- Species: B. flora

Binomial name
- Bergaris flora Yakovlev, 2006

Species of moth

Bergaris flora is a moth in the family Cossidae. It was described by Yakovlev in 2006. It is found on Flores and Sumba.

The length of the forewings is 24–28 mm.
