= Bergaris ruficeps =

Scientific classification
- Kingdom: Animalia
- Phylum: Arthropoda
- Class: Insecta
- Order: Lepidoptera
- Family: Cossidae
- Genus: Bergaris
- Species: B. ruficeps

Binomial name
- Bergaris ruficeps (de Joannis, 1929)

Synonyms
- Azygophleps ruficeps de Joannis, 1929

Species of moth

Bergaris ruficeps is a species of moth of the family Cossidae. It is found in Vietnam.
