= Sinjaeviella elegantissima =

Scientific classification
- Kingdom: Animalia
- Phylum: Arthropoda
- Clade: Pancrustacea
- Class: Insecta
- Order: Lepidoptera
- Family: Cossidae
- Genus: Sinjaeviella
- Species: S. elegantissima

Binomial name
- Sinjaeviella elegantissima Yakovlev, 2009

Species of moth

Sinjaeviella elegantissima is a moth in the family Cossidae. It is found in the Republic of Congo.
