= Schoorlea =

Scientific classification
- Kingdom: Animalia
- Phylum: Arthropoda
- Clade: Pancrustacea
- Class: Insecta
- Order: Lepidoptera
- Family: Cossidae
- Subfamily: Zeuzerinae
- Genus: Schoorlea; Yakovlev, 2011
- Species: S. duffelsi

Binomial name
- Schoorlea duffelsi (Schoorl, 1999)

Synonyms
- Zeuzera duffelsi Schoorl, 1999

Genus of moths

Schoorlea is a genus of moths in the family Cossidae. It contains only one species, Schoorlea duffelsi, which is found on Sulawesi.
