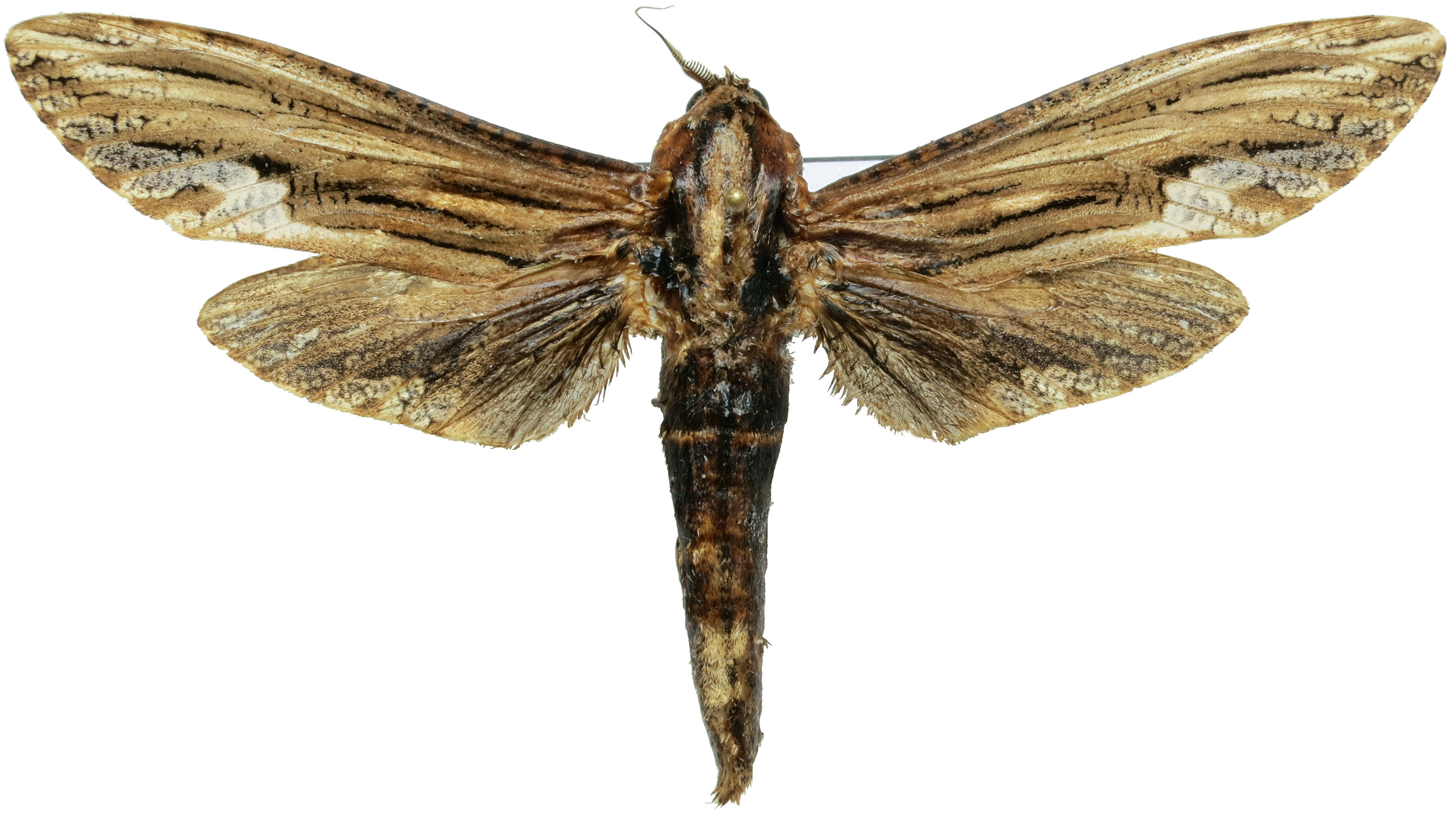

Scientific classification
- Kingdom: Animalia
- Phylum: Arthropoda
- Clade: Pancrustacea
- Class: Insecta
- Order: Lepidoptera
- Family: Cossidae
- Tribe: Xyleutini
- Genus: Duomitus; Butler, 1880
- Species: D. ceramicus

Binomial name
- Duomitus ceramicus (Walker, 1865)

Synonyms
- Xyleutes ceramica Walker, 1865; Duomitus ceramica; Duomitus ligneus Butler, 1880; Eudoxyla bosschae Heylaerts, 1886

= Duomitus =

Genus of moths

Duomitus is a monotypic genus of moths in the family Cossidae described by Arthur Gardiner Butler in 1880. Its only species, Duomitus ceramicus, described by Francis Walker in 1865, is found in Yunnan in China and from southern India and Malaysia to Sumatra, Ceram and New Guinea.

== Description ==
Palpi are minute. Antennae of male with proximal half bipectinate (comb like on both sides), the distal half is simple, wholly simple in female. Legs without spurs. Wings are long and narrow. Forewing with very large areole. Vein 11 given off from 10. Hindwing with no bar between veins 7 and 8, veins 4 and 5 given off separately. The fork of the veinlets in the cell of both wings are broad.

== Former species ==
- Duomitus fuscipans Hampson, 1892
