= Bergaris lutescens =

Scientific classification
- Domain: Eukaryota
- Kingdom: Animalia
- Phylum: Arthropoda
- Class: Insecta
- Order: Lepidoptera
- Family: Cossidae
- Genus: Bergaris
- Species: B. lutescens

Binomial name
- Bergaris lutescens (Roepke, 1957)

Synonyms
- Xyleutes lutescens Roepke, 1957; Xyleutes lutescens griseola Roepke, 1957

Species of moth

Bergaris lutescens is a species of moth of the family Cossidae. It is found in Malaysia, Myanmar and on Borneo. The habitat consists of lowland forests, including dry heath forests.

== Subspecies ==
- Bergaris lutescens lutescens
- Bergaris lutescens griseola (Roepke, 1957) Malaysia
