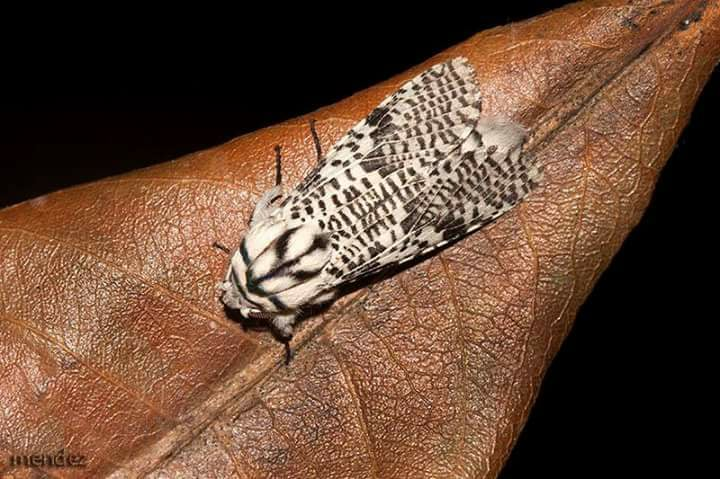
- In Misiones, Argentina

Scientific classification
- Kingdom: Animalia
- Phylum: Arthropoda
- Class: Insecta
- Order: Lepidoptera
- Family: Cossidae
- Subfamily: Zeuzerinae
- Genus: Schreiteriana; D. S. Fletcher, 1982
- Species: S. pectinicornis

Binomial name
- Schreiteriana pectinicornis (Dyar, 1937)

Synonyms
- Schreiteria Dyar, 1937; Schreiteria pectinicornis Dyar, 1937

= Schreiteriana =

Genus of moths

Schreiteriana is a monotypic moth genus in the family Cossidae described in 1937 and renamed in 1982 by David Stephen Fletcher. Its only species, Schreiteriana pectinicornis, was described by Harrison Gray Dyar Jr. in 1937 and is found in Argentina.
