= Tarsozeuzera vavizola =

Scientific classification
- Kingdom: Animalia
- Phylum: Arthropoda
- Clade: Pancrustacea
- Class: Insecta
- Order: Lepidoptera
- Family: Cossidae
- Genus: Tarsozeuzera
- Species: T. vavizola

Binomial name
- Tarsozeuzera vavizola Yakovlev, 2006

Species of moth

Tarsozeuzera vavizola is a moth in the family Cossidae. It was described by Yakovlev in 2006. It is found in southern Thailand.

The length of the forewings is about 16 mm.
