= Morpheis lelex =

Scientific classification
- Kingdom: Animalia
- Phylum: Arthropoda
- Class: Insecta
- Order: Lepidoptera
- Family: Cossidae
- Genus: Morpheis
- Species: M. lelex

Binomial name
- Morpheis lelex (Dognin, 1891)

Synonyms
- Zeuzera lelex Dognin, 1891

Species of moth

Morpheis lelex is a moth in the family Cossidae. It was described by Paul Dognin in 1891. It is found in Venezuela.
