= Hermophyllon =

Scientific classification
- Kingdom: Animalia
- Phylum: Arthropoda
- Clade: Pancrustacea
- Class: Insecta
- Order: Lepidoptera
- Family: Cossidae
- Subfamily: Zeuzerinae
- Genus: Hermophyllon; Schoorl, 1990
- Species: H. anceps

Binomial name
- Hermophyllon anceps (Snellen, 1900)

Synonyms
- Endoxyla anceps Snellen, 1900; Xyleutes plesseni Schultze, 1925

Species of moth

Hermophyllon anceps is a moth in the family Cossidae, and the only species in the genus Hermophyllon. It is found in Malaysia (Sabah), Indonesia (Sumatra, Nias, Kalimantan and Java) and the Philippines.

== Etymology ==
The genus name refers to the Greek god Hermes plus Greek phyllon (meaning leaf).
