= Morpheis clenchi =

Scientific classification
- Kingdom: Animalia
- Phylum: Arthropoda
- Class: Insecta
- Order: Lepidoptera
- Family: Cossidae
- Genus: Morpheis
- Species: M. clenchi

Binomial name
- Morpheis clenchi Donahue, 1980

Species of moth

Morpheis clenchi is a moth in the family Cossidae. It was described by Donahue in 1980. It is found in North America, where it has been recorded from Arizona. It is also present in northern Mexico.

Adults have been recorded on wing in July.

== Etymology ==
The species is named in honour of Harry K. Clench.
