= Aethalopteryx obsolete =

Scientific classification
- Domain: Eukaryota
- Kingdom: Animalia
- Phylum: Arthropoda
- Class: Insecta
- Order: Lepidoptera
- Family: Cossidae
- Genus: Aethalopteryx
- Species: A. obsolete

Binomial name
- Aethalopteryx obsolete (Gaede, 1930)

Synonyms
- Xyleutes obscurascens obsolete Gaede, 1930

Species of moth

Aethalopteryx obsolete is a moth in the family Cossidae. It is found in Sudan, Tanzania and Eswatini.
