= Rugigegat =

Scientific classification
- Kingdom: Animalia
- Phylum: Arthropoda
- Clade: Pancrustacea
- Class: Insecta
- Order: Lepidoptera
- Family: Cossidae
- Subfamily: Zeuzerinae
- Genus: Rugigegat; Schoorl, 1990

Genus of moths

Rugigegat is a genus of moths in the family Cossidae.

== Species ==
- Rugigegat nigra (Moore, 1877)
- Rugigegat radzha Yakovlev, 2009
