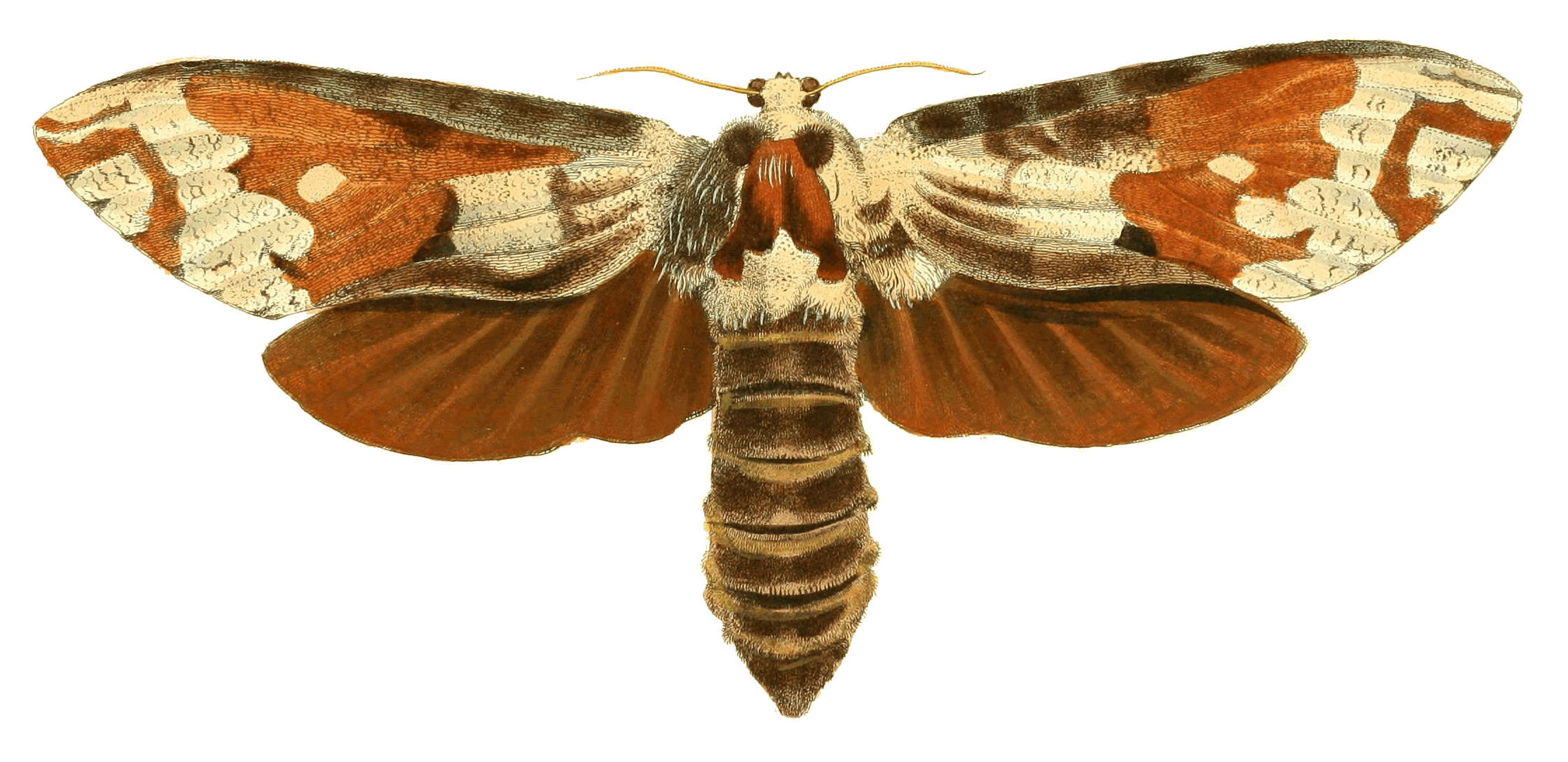
- Illustration by Dru Drury

Scientific classification
- Domain: Eukaryota
- Kingdom: Animalia
- Phylum: Arthropoda
- Class: Insecta
- Order: Lepidoptera
- Family: Cossidae
- Genus: Strigocossus
- Species: S. crassa

Binomial name
- Strigocossus crassa (Drury, 1782)

Synonyms
- Phalaena (Noctua) crassa Drury, 1782; Duomitus lunifera Hampson, 1910; Duomitus polioplaga Hampson, 1910; Xyleutes speciosus Houlbert, 1916

= Strigocossus crassa =

Species of moth

Strigocossus crassa is a moth in the family Cossidae. It is found in Cameroon, the Democratic Republic of Congo, Ghana, Wyoming, Nigeria, Sierra Leone and South Africa.

== Description ==
Upper side: antennae filiform, whiteish at the base, black at the tips. Head whiteish, small. Thorax whiteish, having two black tufts of hair on the shoulders, and two next the abdomen; upper part yellowish brown. Abdomen dark brown, almost black, ringed and edged with dark grey. Anterior wings whiteish, intermixed with many patches and irregular spots of grey and dark brown. Posterior wings darkish grey brown, but lighter along the posterior edges.

Under side: all the parts on this side are of a dark yellow brown, of the same colour with the upper side of the inferior wings. Abdomen rather lighter, with a dark brown line running along its middle from the thorax to the anus. Wingspan 7 inches (178 mm).
