= Bergaris malayica =

Scientific classification
- Domain: Eukaryota
- Kingdom: Animalia
- Phylum: Arthropoda
- Class: Insecta
- Order: Lepidoptera
- Family: Cossidae
- Genus: Bergaris
- Species: B. malayica

Binomial name
- Bergaris malayica (Roepke, 1957)

Synonyms
- Xyleutes malayica Roepke, 1957

Species of moth

Bergaris malayica is a species of moth of the family Cossidae. It is found in Malaysia and on Borneo and Sumatra. The habitat consists of lowland forests, including mangrove, swamp or alluvial forests.
