= Brephomorpha =

Scientific classification
- Kingdom: Animalia
- Phylum: Arthropoda
- Class: Insecta
- Order: Lepidoptera
- Family: Cossidae
- Subfamily: Zeuzerinae
- Genus: Brephomorpha; D. S. Fletcher, 1982
- Species: B. cineraria

Binomial name
- Brephomorpha cineraria (Turner, 1945)

Synonyms
- Nepiomorpha Turner, 1945 (preocc. Pearman, 1936); Nepiomorpha cineraria Turner, 1945

Genus of moths

Brephomorpha is a monotypic moth genus in the family Cossidae described by David Stephen Fletcher in 1982. It contains only one species, Brephomorpha cineraria, described by Alfred Jefferis Turner in 1945, which is found in Australia, where it has been recorded from northern Queensland.
