= Rugigegat radzha =

Scientific classification
- Kingdom: Animalia
- Phylum: Arthropoda
- Clade: Pancrustacea
- Class: Insecta
- Order: Lepidoptera
- Family: Cossidae
- Genus: Rugigegat
- Species: R. radzha

Binomial name
- Rugigegat radzha Yakovlev, 2009

Species of moth

Rugigegat radzha is a moth in the family Cossidae. It was described by Yakovlev in 2009. It is found in southern India.
