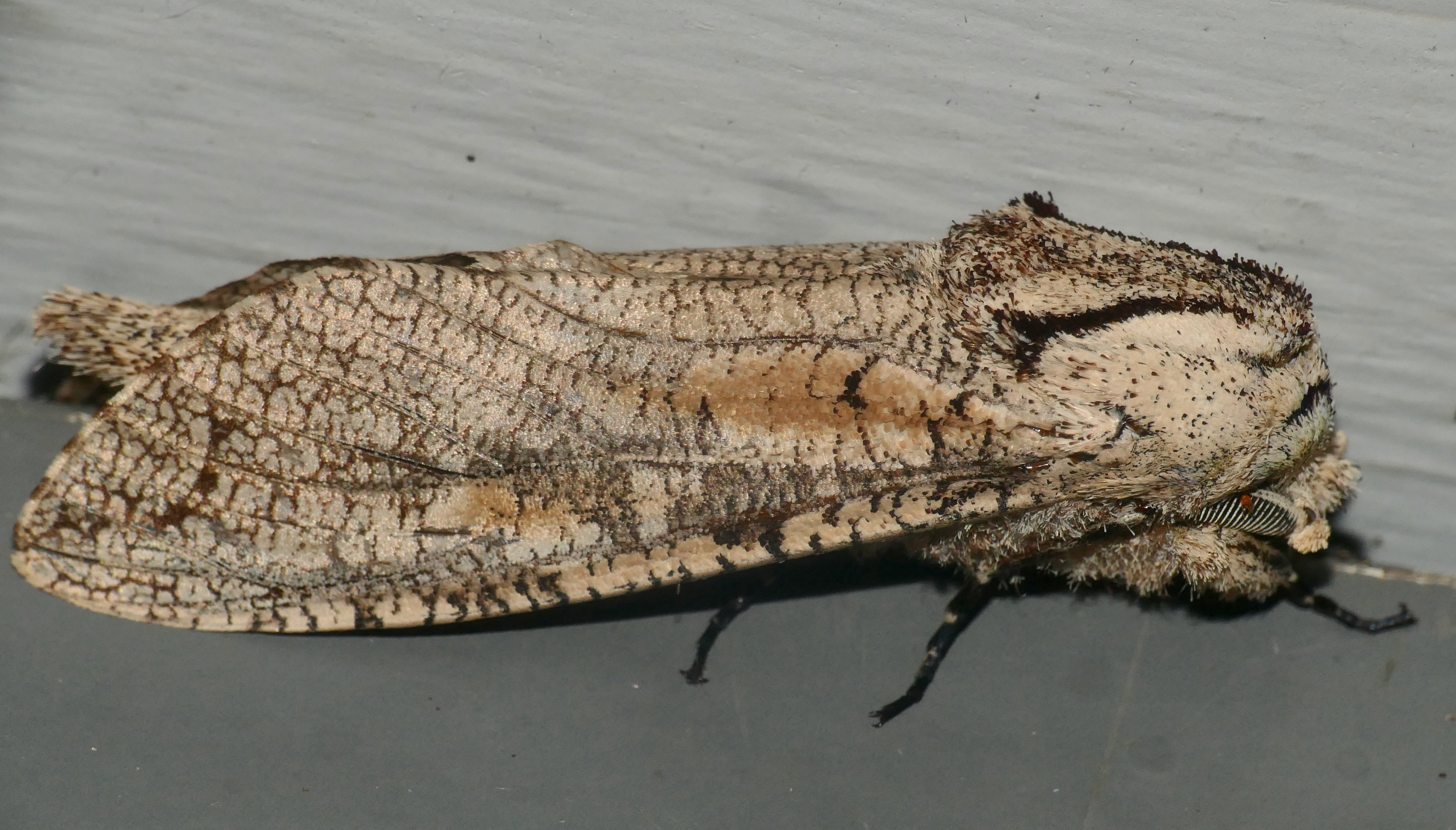

Scientific classification
- Kingdom: Animalia
- Phylum: Arthropoda
- Class: Insecta
- Order: Lepidoptera
- Family: Cossidae
- Genus: Strigocossus
- Species: S. capensis

Binomial name
- Strigocossus capensis (Walker, 1856)

Synonyms
- Zeuzera capensis Walker, 1856; Xyleutes sjoestedti Aurivillius, 1910; Azygophleps flavitincta Hampson, 1910; Azygophleps kilimandjarae Le Cerf, 1914

= Strigocossus capensis =

Species of moth

Strigocossus capensis is a moth in the family Cossidae. It is found in the Democratic Republic of Congo, Kenya, Malawi, South Africa, Tanzania, Uganda and Zimbabwe.

The larvae feed on Cassia bicapsularis, Cassia siamea, Cassia laevigata, Senna didymobotrya, Ricinus communis, Pavonia columella and Hibiscus fuscus.
