= Carohamilia ophelia =

Scientific classification
- Kingdom: Animalia
- Phylum: Arthropoda
- Clade: Pancrustacea
- Class: Insecta
- Order: Lepidoptera
- Family: Cossidae
- Genus: Carohamilia
- Species: C. ophelia

Binomial name
- Carohamilia ophelia (Schaus, 1921)

Synonyms
- Lentagena ophelia Schaus, 1921

Species of moth

Carohamilia ophelia is a moth in the family Cossidae. It is found in Guatemala.

The wingspan is about 35 mm. The forewings are white with greyish transverse striae. There are a few brown irrorations at the inner margin, as well as a triangular fuscous brown spot on the base of the costal margin. The hindwings are white.
