= Cecryphalus helenae =

Scientific classification
- Kingdom: Animalia
- Phylum: Arthropoda
- Class: Insecta
- Order: Lepidoptera
- Family: Cossidae
- Genus: Cecryphalus
- Species: C. helenae

Binomial name
- Cecryphalus helenae (Le Cerf, 1924)

Synonyms
- Zeuzera helenae Le Cerf, 1924

Species of moth

Cecryphalus helenae is a moth in the family Cossidae. It is found in Morocco.
