= Paralophonotus =

Scientific classification
- Kingdom: Animalia
- Phylum: Arthropoda
- Clade: Pancrustacea
- Class: Insecta
- Order: Lepidoptera
- Family: Cossidae
- Subfamily: Zeuzerinae
- Genus: Paralophonotus; Schoorl, 1990
- Species: P. auroguttata

Binomial name
- Paralophonotus auroguttata (Herrich-Schäffer, 1854)

Synonyms
- Zeuzera auroguttata Herrich-Schaffer, 1854

Species of moth

Paralophonotus auroguttata is a moth in the family Cossidae, and the only species in the genus Paralophonotus. It is found in Angola, Cameroon, the Democratic Republic of Congo, Ghana, Guinea-Bissau and Sierra Leone.
