= Eburgemellus =

Scientific classification
- Kingdom: Animalia
- Phylum: Arthropoda
- Clade: Pancrustacea
- Class: Insecta
- Order: Lepidoptera
- Family: Cossidae
- Subfamily: Zeuzerinae
- Genus: Eburgemellus; Schoorl, 1990
- Species: E. geminatus

Binomial name
- Eburgemellus geminatus (Gaede, 1930)

Synonyms
- Xyleutes geminatus Gaede, 1930

Monotypic moth genus in family Cossidae

Eburgemellus is a monotypic moth genus in the family Cossidae. Eburgemellus geminatus, the only species in the genus, is found in Cameroon and Ivory Coast.
