= Strigocossus kushit =

Scientific classification
- Kingdom: Animalia
- Phylum: Arthropoda
- Clade: Pancrustacea
- Class: Insecta
- Order: Lepidoptera
- Family: Cossidae
- Genus: Strigocossus
- Species: S. kushit

Binomial name
- Strigocossus kushit Yakovlev, 2011

Species of moth

Strigocossus kushit is a moth in the family Cossidae. It was described by Yakovlev in 2011. It is found in Ethiopia.
