= Strigocossus tandoensis =

Scientific classification
- Domain: Eukaryota
- Kingdom: Animalia
- Phylum: Arthropoda
- Class: Insecta
- Order: Lepidoptera
- Family: Cossidae
- Genus: Strigocossus
- Species: S. tandoensis

Binomial name
- Strigocossus tandoensis (Bethune-Baker, 1927)

Synonyms
- Azygophleps tandoensis Bethune-Baker, 1927

Species of moth

Strigocossus tandoensis is a moth in the family Cossidae. It is found in Angola, the Republic of Congo, Kenya and Malawi.

The wingspan is about 52 mm for males and 72 mm for females. The forewings are dull pale brownish, darker along the costa. The interspaces of the veins from vein two to the apex of the wing have very dark brown lines. The lines are irregular and minutely crinkled. There is a short dark, slightly arched dash in the fold above vein one. The hindwings are grey, with an internervular fine network.
