= Catoxophylla =

Scientific classification
- Domain: Eukaryota
- Kingdom: Animalia
- Phylum: Arthropoda
- Class: Insecta
- Order: Lepidoptera
- Family: Cossidae
- Subfamily: Zeuzerinae
- Genus: Catoxophylla; Turner, 1945
- Species: C. cyanaugus

Binomial name
- Catoxophylla cyanaugus Turner, 1945

Species of moth

Catoxophylla cyanaugus is a moth in the family Cossidae, and the only species in the genus Catoxophylla. It is found in Australia, where it has been recorded from Western Australia.
