= Aethalopteryx mesosticta =

Scientific classification
- Kingdom: Animalia
- Phylum: Arthropoda
- Class: Insecta
- Order: Lepidoptera
- Family: Cossidae
- Genus: Aethalopteryx
- Species: A. mesosticta

Binomial name
- Aethalopteryx mesosticta (Hampson in Poulton, 1916)

Synonyms
- Duomitus mesosticta Hampson in Poulton, 1916

Species of moth

Aethalopteryx mesosticta is a moth in the family Cossidae. It is found in Somalia.
