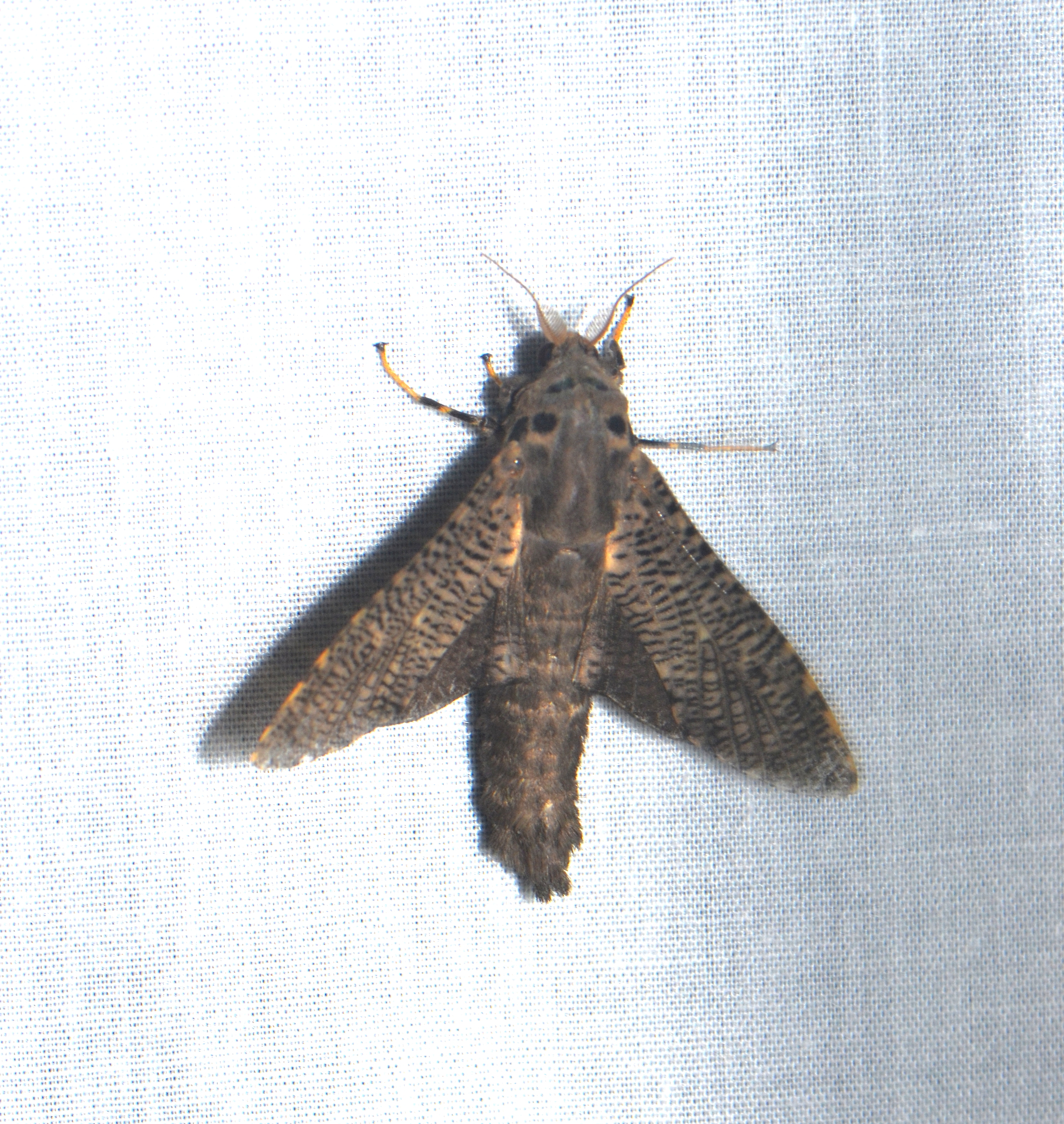
- Image of Bergaris

Scientific classification
- Kingdom: Animalia
- Phylum: Arthropoda
- Clade: Pancrustacea
- Class: Insecta
- Order: Lepidoptera
- Family: Cossidae
- Subfamily: Zeuzerinae
- Genus: Bergaris; Schoorl, 1990

= Bergaris =

Moth genus in family Cossidae

Bergaris is a genus of moths in the family Cossidae. The species are Southeast Asian, ranging from Myanmar and Vietnam to Sulawesi.

== Species ==
- Bergaris flora Yakovlev, 2006
- Bergaris halim Yakovlev, 2011
- Bergaris jacobsoni (Roepke, 1957)
- Bergaris lutescens (Roepke, 1957)
- Bergaris malayica (Roepke, 1957)
- Bergaris ruficeps (de Joannis, 1929)
- Bergaris solovievi Yakovlev, 2011
