= Rapdalus albicolor =

Scientific classification
- Kingdom: Animalia
- Phylum: Arthropoda
- Clade: Pancrustacea
- Class: Insecta
- Order: Lepidoptera
- Family: Cossidae
- Genus: Rapdalus
- Species: R. albicolor

Binomial name
- Rapdalus albicolor Yakovlev, 2006

Species of moth

Rapdalus albicolor is a moth in the family Cossidae. It was described by Yakovlev in 2006. It is found in the Philippines (Palawan, Luzon).

The length of the forewings is 16–22 mm.

== Subspecies ==
- Rapdalus albicolor albicolor (Philippines: Palawan)
- Rapdalus albicolor luzonicus Yakovlev, 2006 (Philippines: Luzon)
