= Panau speideli =

Scientific classification
- Kingdom: Animalia
- Phylum: Arthropoda
- Clade: Pancrustacea
- Class: Insecta
- Order: Lepidoptera
- Family: Cossidae
- Genus: Panau
- Species: P. speideli

Binomial name
- Panau speideli Yakovlev, 2011

Species of moth

Panau speideli is a moth in the family Cossidae. It was described by Yakovlev in 2011. It is found on Sumatra.
