= Neurozerra =

Scientific classification
- Kingdom: Animalia
- Phylum: Arthropoda
- Clade: Pancrustacea
- Class: Insecta
- Order: Lepidoptera
- Family: Cossidae
- Subfamily: Zeuzerinae
- Genus: Neurozerra; Yakovlev, 2011

Genus of moths

Neurozerra is a genus of moths in the family Cossidae. Three species of Neurozerra have been identified within the Cossidae, which comprises mostly large moths.

== Species ==
- Neurozerra conferta (Walker, 1856)
- Neurozerra flavicera (Hua, Chou, Fang et Chen, 1990)
- Neurozerra roricyanea (Walker, 1862)
