= Morpheis discreta =

Scientific classification
- Kingdom: Animalia
- Phylum: Arthropoda
- Class: Insecta
- Order: Lepidoptera
- Family: Cossidae
- Genus: Morpheis
- Species: M. discreta

Binomial name
- Morpheis discreta (Dyar, 1937)

Synonyms
- Xyleutes discreta Dyar, 1937

Species of moth

Morpheis discreta is a moth in the family Cossidae. It was described by Harrison Gray Dyar Jr. in 1937. It is found in Brazil.
