= Aethalopteryx gyldenstolpei =

Scientific classification
- Domain: Eukaryota
- Kingdom: Animalia
- Phylum: Arthropoda
- Class: Insecta
- Order: Lepidoptera
- Family: Cossidae
- Genus: Aethalopteryx
- Species: A. gyldenstolpei

Binomial name
- Aethalopteryx gyldenstolpei (Aurivillius, 1925)

Synonyms
- Xyleutes gyldenstolpei Aurivillius, 1925

Species of moth

Aethalopteryx gyldenstolpei is a moth in the family Cossidae. It is found in the Democratic Republic of the Congo.
