= Psychonoctua =

Scientific classification
- Kingdom: Animalia
- Phylum: Arthropoda
- Class: Insecta
- Order: Lepidoptera
- Family: Cossidae
- Subfamily: Zeuzerinae
- Genus: Psychonoctua; Grote, 1865

Genus of moths

Psychonoctua is a genus of moths in the family Cossidae. It ranges from California to Guyana, with one species in the Greater Antilles.

== Species ==
- Psychonoctua albogrisea (Dognin, 1916)
- Psychonoctua gilensis (Barnes & McDunnough, 1910)
- Psychonoctua masoni (Schaus, 1892)
- Psychonoctua nullifer Dyar, 1914
- Psychonoctua personalis Grote, 1865
