= Zeurrora =

Scientific classification
- Kingdom: Animalia
- Phylum: Arthropoda
- Clade: Pancrustacea
- Class: Insecta
- Order: Lepidoptera
- Family: Cossidae
- Subfamily: Zeuzerinae
- Genus: Zeurrora; Yakovlev, 2011
- Species: Z. indica

Binomial name
- Zeurrora indica (Herrich-Schäffer, [1854])

Synonyms
- Zeuzera indica Herrich-Schäffer, [1854]; Zeuzera paucipunctata Walker, 1856; Zeuzera viridimacula Matsumura, 1931

Genus of moths

Zeurrora is a genus of moths in the family Cossidae. It contains only species, Zeurrora indica, is found in India, China, Bangladesh and on Peninsular Malaya and Java, as well as in New Guinea.
