= Acosma =

Scientific classification
- Kingdom: Animalia
- Phylum: Arthropoda
- Clade: Pancrustacea
- Class: Insecta
- Order: Lepidoptera
- Family: Cossidae
- Subfamily: Zeuzerinae
- Genus: Acosma; Yakovlev, 2011
- Species: A. gurkoi

Binomial name
- Acosma gurkoi Yakovlev, 2011

Genus of moths

Acosma is a monotypic moth genus in the family Cossidae described by Roman V. Yakovlev in 2011. It contains only one species, Acosma gurkoi, described in the same article, which is found in South Sudan.
