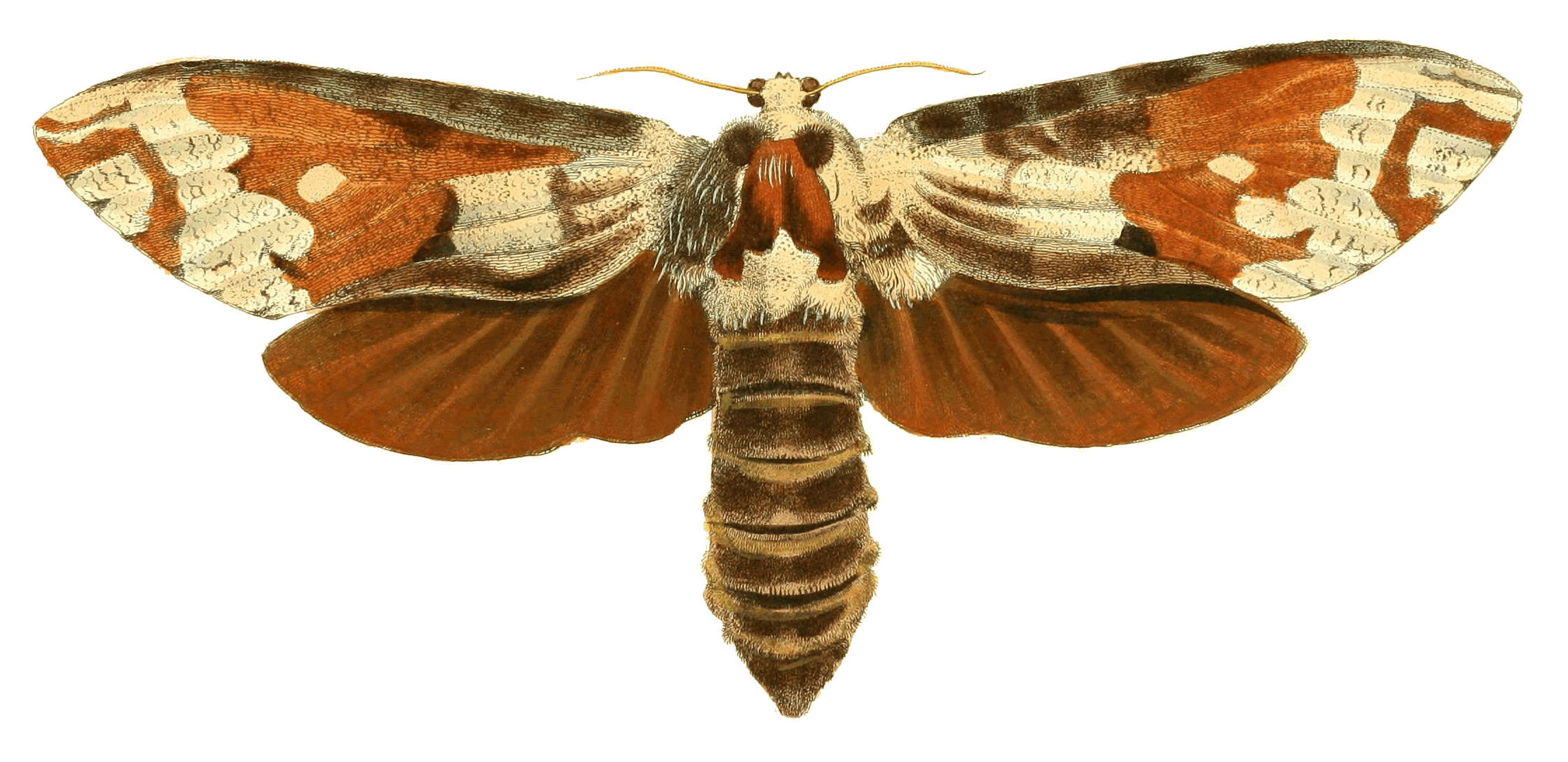
- Extract from Plate II. HEPIALUS CRASSUS (= Strigocossus crassa).

Scientific classification
- Domain: Eukaryota
- Kingdom: Animalia
- Phylum: Arthropoda
- Class: Insecta
- Order: Lepidoptera
- Family: Cossidae
- Subfamily: Zeuzerinae
- Genus: Strigocossus; Houlbert, 1916

Species
- See text

Synonyms
- Xylocossus Houlbert, 1916

= Strigocossus =

Genus of moths

Strigocossus ) is a genus of large moths belonging to the subfamily Zeuzerinae in family Cossidae. The genus was described by Constant Vincent Houlbert in 1916 ((type species – Strigocossus leucopteris)

== Species ==
The genus includes 13 species, widely distributed in Sub-Saharan Africa and Madagadcar:

- Strigocossus ambahona (Viette, 1954)
- Strigocossus crassa (Drury, 1782)
- Strigocossus capensis (Walker, 1856)
- Strigocossus cretacea (Butler, 1878)
- Strigocossus elephas Yakovlev, 2013
- Strigocossus guillemei (Houlbert, 1916)
- Strigocossus hepialoides Yakovlev, 2011
- Strigocossus kushit Yakovlev, 2011
- Strigocossus mediopallens (D. S. Fletcher, 1968)
- Strigocossus moderata (Walker, 1856)
- Strigocossus ochricosta (D. S. Fletcher, 1968)
- Strigocossus ralffiebigi Yakovlev, 2021
- Strigocossus tandoensis (Bethune-Baker, 1927)

== Former species ==
- Strigocossus kilimandjarae (Le Cerf, 1914)
- Strigocossus leucopteris Houlbert, 1916
- Strigocossus vosseleri (Gaede, 1930)
