= Psychonoctua gilensis =

Scientific classification
- Kingdom: Animalia
- Phylum: Arthropoda
- Class: Insecta
- Order: Lepidoptera
- Family: Cossidae
- Genus: Psychonoctua
- Species: P. gilensis

Binomial name
- Psychonoctua gilensis (Barnes & McDunnough, 1910)

Synonyms
- Hamilcara gilensis Barnes & McDunnough, 1910

Species of moth

Psychonoctua gilensis is a moth in the family Cossidae first described by William Barnes and James Halliday McDunnough in 1910. It is found in North America, where it has been recorded from California and Arizona.
