= Aramos ramosa =

Scientific classification
- Kingdom: Animalia
- Phylum: Arthropoda
- Class: Insecta
- Order: Lepidoptera
- Family: Cossidae
- Genus: Aramos
- Species: A. ramosa

Binomial name
- Aramos ramosa (Schaus, 1892)

Synonyms
- Zeuzera ramosa Schaus, 1892; Hamilcara ramosa; Zeuzera aeetes Druce, 1906; Zeuzera ramuscula Dyar, 1906

Species of moth

Aramos ramosa is a moth in the family Cossidae. It is found in Texas in the United States and Quintana Roo and Yucatán in Mexico.

Adults have been recorded on wing in June and from August to October.
