= Aramos itys =

Scientific classification
- Kingdom: Animalia
- Phylum: Arthropoda
- Class: Insecta
- Order: Lepidoptera
- Family: Cossidae
- Genus: Aramos
- Species: A. itys

Binomial name
- Aramos itys (H. Druce, 1911)

Synonyms
- Zeuzera itys H. Druce, 1911; Carohamilia itys

Species of moth

Aramos itys is a moth in the family Cossidae first described by Herbert Druce in 1911. It is found in Colombia.
