= Psychonoctua masoni =

Scientific classification
- Kingdom: Animalia
- Phylum: Arthropoda
- Clade: Pancrustacea
- Class: Insecta
- Order: Lepidoptera
- Family: Cossidae
- Genus: Psychonoctua
- Species: P. masoni

Binomial name
- Psychonoctua masoni (Schaus, 1892)

Synonyms
- Zeuzera masoni Schaus, 1894; Aramos masoni

Species of moth

Psychonoctua masoni is a moth in the family Cossidae. It was described by William Schaus in 1892. It is found in Mexico and southern Texas.
