= List of moths of Australia (Cossidae) =

Partial list of Australian moths

This is a list of the Australian species of the family Cossidae. It also acts as an index to the species articles and forms part of the full List of moths of Australia.

== Cossinae ==
- Cossodes lyonetii White, 1841
- Culama alpina Kallies & D.J. Hilton, 2012
- Culama anthracica Kallies & D.J. Hilton, 2012
- Culama australis Walker, 1856
- Culama crepera Turner, 1939
- Culama dasythrix Turner, 1945
- Culama glauca Kallies & D.J. Hilton, 2012
- Culama suffusca Kallies & D.J. Hilton, 2012
- Macrocyttara expressa (T.P. Lucas, 1902)
- Macrocyttara pamphaea Turner, 1945
- Zyganisus acalanthis Kallies & D.J. Hilton, 2012
- Zyganisus caliginosus (Walker, 1856)
- Zyganisus cadigalorum Kallies & D.J. Hilton, 2012
- Zyganisus fulvicollis (Gaede, 1933)
- Zyganisus propedia Kallies & D.J. Hilton, 2012

== Zeuzerinae ==
- Brephomorpha cineraria (Turner, 1945)
- Catoxophylla cyanauges Turner, 1945
- Duomitus ceramica (Walker, 1865)
- Endoxyla acontucha (Turner, 1903)
- Endoxyla affinis (Rothschild, 1896)
- Endoxyla amphiplecta (Turner, 1932)
- Endoxyla angasii R. Felder, 1874
- Endoxyla biarpiti (Tindale, 1953)
- Endoxyla bipustulatus (Walker, 1865)
- Endoxyla cinereus (Tepper, 1890)
- Endoxyla columbina T.P. Lucas, 1898
- Endoxyla coscinopa (Lower, 1901)
- Endoxyla coscinophanes (Turner, 1945)
- Endoxyla coscinota (Turner, 1903)
- Endoxyla decoratus (Swinhoe, 1892)
- Endoxyla dictyoschema (Turner, 1915)
- Endoxyla didymoplaca (Turner, 1945)
- Endoxyla duponchelii (Newman, 1856)
- Endoxyla edwardsorum (Tepper, 1891)
- Endoxyla eluta (Rothschild, 1903)
- Endoxyla encalypti Herrich-Schäffer, 1854
- Endoxyla episticha (Turner, 1945)
- Endoxyla eremonoma (Turner, 1906)
- Endoxyla eumitra (Turner, 1926)
- Endoxyla euplecta (Turner, 1945)
- Endoxyla euryphaea (Turner, 1945)
- Endoxyla grisea (Gaede, 1933)
- Endoxyla houlberti (Oberthür, 1916)
- Endoxyla interlucens T.P. Lucas, 1898
- Endoxyla leucomochla (Turner, 1915)
- Endoxyla lichenea (Rothschild, 1896)
- Endoxyla lituratus (Donovan, 1805)
- Endoxyla mackeri (Oberthür, 1916)
- Endoxyla macleayi Froggatt, 1894
- Endoxyla magnifica (Rothschild, 1896)
- Endoxyla magniguttata (Gaede, 1933)
- Endoxyla methychroa (Turner, 1911)
- Endoxyla minutiscripta T.P. Lucas, 1898
- Endoxyla nephocosma (Turner, 1902)
- Endoxyla neuroxantha (Lower, 1900)
- Endoxyla nubila (Turner, 1945)
- Endoxyla opposita (Walker, 1865)
- Endoxyla perigypsa (Lower, 1915)
- Endoxyla phaeocosma (Turner, 1911)
- Endoxyla polyplecta (Turner, 1932)
- Endoxyla polyploca (Turner, 1911)
- Endoxyla pulchra (Rothschild, 1896)
- Endoxyla punctifimbria (Walker, 1865)
- Endoxyla reticulosa (Turner, 1945)
- Endoxyla secta T.P. Lucas, 1898
- Endoxyla sordida (Rothschild, 1896)
- Endoxyla stenoptila (Turner, 1911)
- Endoxyla tanyctena (Turner, 1945)
- Endoxyla tenebrifer (Walker, 1865)
- Endoxyla tigrinus (Herrich-Schäffer, 1853)
- Endoxyla turneri (Roepke, 1955)
- Endoxyla vittata (Walker, 1856)
- Endoxyla zophoplecta (Turner, 1902)
- Endoxyla zophospila (Turner, 1945)
- Skeletophyllon tempestua (T.P. Lucas, 1898)
- Sympycnodes adrienneae Kallies & D.J. Hilton, 2012
- Sympycnodes arachnophora (Turner, 1945)
- Sympycnodes digitata Kallies & D.J. Hilton, 2012
- Sympycnodes dunnorum Kallies & D.J. Hilton, 2012
- Sympycnodes epicycla (Turner, 1945)
- Sympycnodes interstincta Kallies & D.J. Hilton, 2012
- Sympycnodes rhaptodes Turner, 1942
- Sympycnodes salterra Kallies & D.J. Hilton, 2012
- Sympycnodes tripartita (T.P. Lucas, 1892)
- Sympycnodes uptoni Kallies & D.J. Hilton, 2012
- Trismelasmos ardzhuna Yakovlev, 2011
- Trismelasmos donovani (Rothschild, 1897)
- Trismelasmos tectorius (Swinhoe, 1901)
- Xyleutes hyphinoe (Cramer, 1777)
- Xyleutes persona (Le Guillou, 1841)
- Orientozeuzera aeglospila (Turner, 1915)
- Orientozeuzera quieta (Turner, 1932)

The following species belongs to the subfamily Zeuzerinae, but has not been assigned to a genus yet. Given here is the original name given to the species when it was first described:

- Eudoxyla cineraria Illidge, 1898

== Unplaced to Subfamily ==
- Archaeoses magicosema (Meyrick, 1936)
- Archaeoses pentasema (Lower, 1915)
- Archaeoses polygrapha (Lower, 1893)
- Brevicyttara cyclospila (Turner, 1945)
- Charmoses dumigani Turner, 1932
- Eusthenica treicleiota (Bethune-Baker, 1911)
- Idioses littleri Turner, 1927
- Ptilomacra senex Walker, 1855
