= O. celebensis =

O. celebensis may refer to:

- Occidozyga celebensis, the Sulawesian puddle frog, a frog species
- Oreophryne celebensis, a frog species
- Orientozeuzera celebensis, a moth species
- Oryzias celebensis, a fish species
