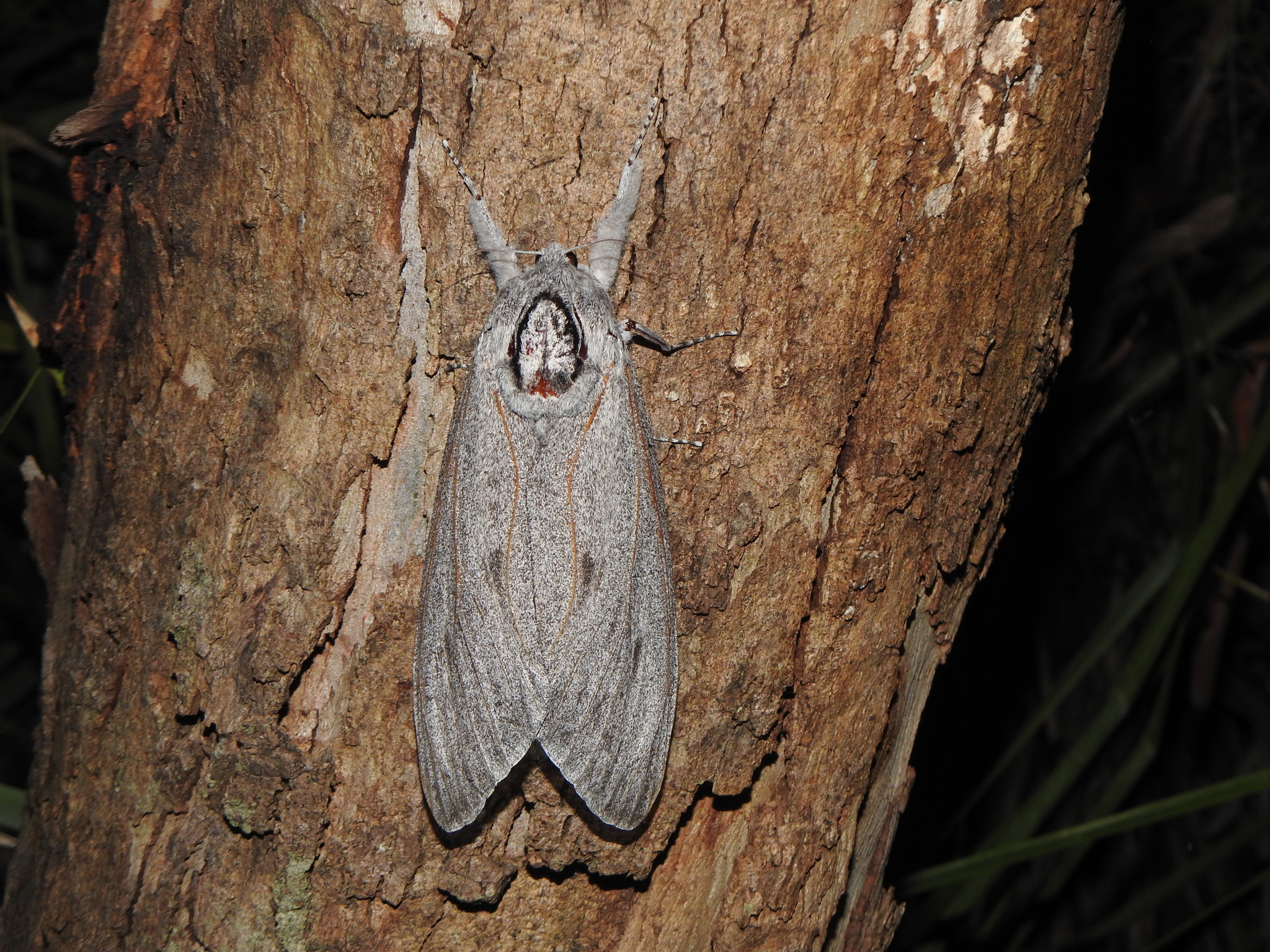
- A giant wood moth found on a tree in Queensland, near Brisbane.
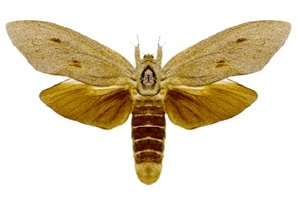
- Wingspan of this species.

Scientific classification
- Kingdom: Animalia
- Phylum: Arthropoda
- Clade: Pancrustacea
- Class: Insecta
- Order: Lepidoptera
- Family: Cossidae
- Genus: Endoxyla
- Species: E. cinereus

Binomial name
- Endoxyla cinereus (Tepper, 1890)

Synonyms
- Cossus cinereus Tepper, 1890; Xyleutes boisduvali Rothschild, 1896; Cossus cinerens Frogatt, 1907; Xyleutes boisduvalli Froggatt, 1923

= Endoxyla cinereus =

Species of moth

Endoxyla cinereus, also commonly known as the giant wood moth, is a species of moth that belongs to the family Cossidae. It is a widespread species being endemic to eastern, southern and southwestern Australia including Queensland and New South Wales and New Zealand. This species is one of the world's heaviest insects, weighing up to 30 grams and having a wingspan of 23 centimeters.

The species was first described in 1890 by J. G. O. Tepper, a Prussian botanist and entomologist. A rare contemporary sighting of the moth at a school in Australia garnered notice as an editor's pick among the daily headlines of the New York Times on May 8, 2021.

== Description ==
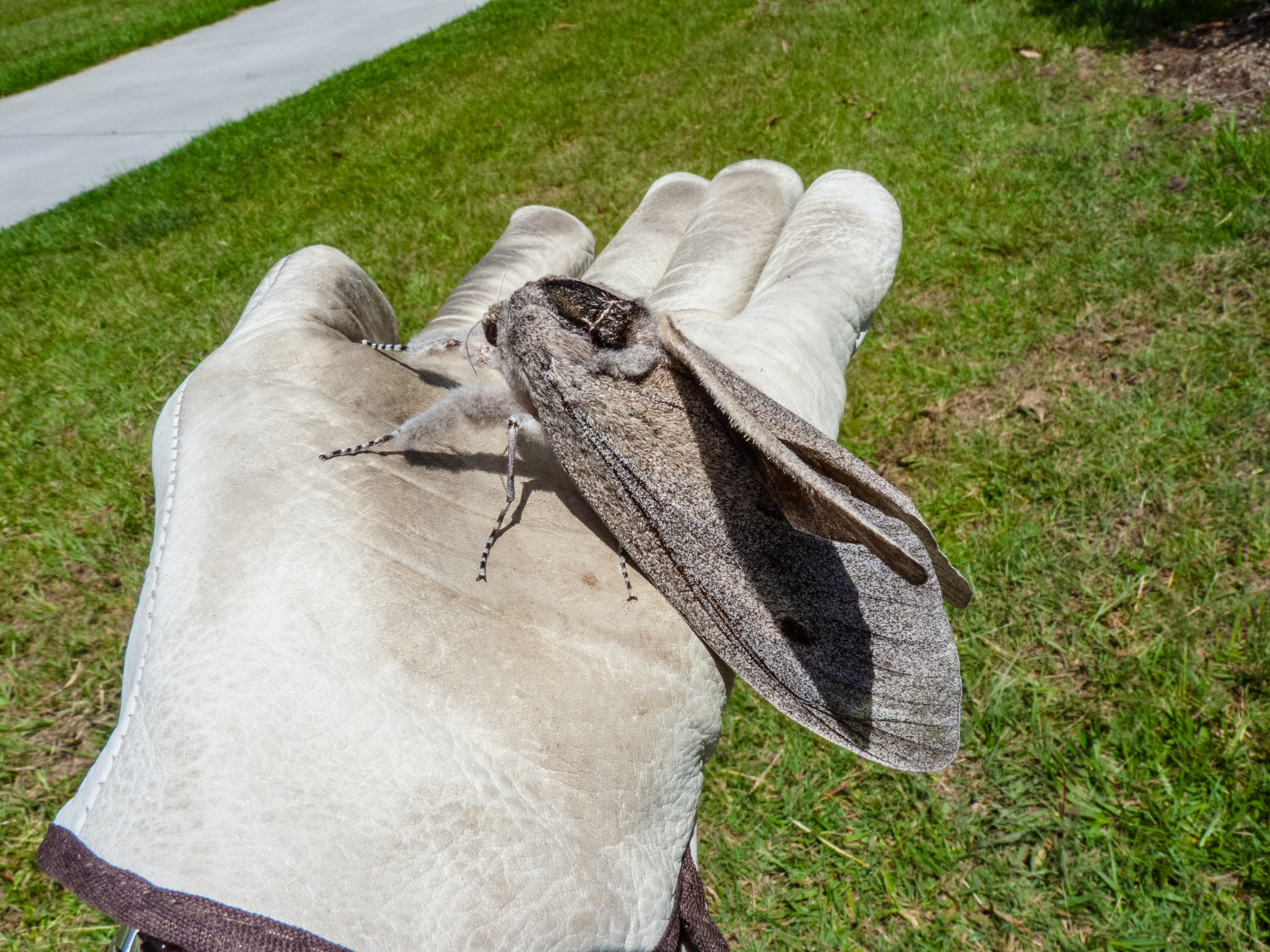
A giant wood moth shown standing on a person's palm for size comparison.

It is the heaviest moth in the world, weighing up to 30 g. Its wingspan is approximately 23 cm, or just over nine inches. Their larvae are around 1.5 mm long when newly hatched, but can grow to be as long as 150 mm. Newly hatched larvae are banded by purple and white stripes, with an orange and black pattern on their prothoracic plate and head.

== Behavior ==
Knowledge on the life history of giant wood moths is not complete. Many gaps in their life history are inferred from closely related species, either within the same genus or family. The species is long-lived and their life history takes several years.

=== Eggs and oviposition ===
The eggs and oviposition of this species have not been observed. Insights on this phase of their life history can be made by looking at other species of the genus Endoxyla. Based on observations of Endoxyla encalypti, it seems that this species can lay as many as 18,000 eggs (likely in mass). These eggs would likely be yellow in color and measure around a millimeter in length as seen in Endoxyla lituratus. Their ovipositors are long and retractable, which would make them well-adapted to depositing eggs in crevices located on bark. However, the host tree species is smooth, which means it is unknown whether it deposits its eggs on another tree species. Under laboratory conditions, newly hatched larvae start to crawl upwards to then drop down on silk. The neonate larvae may then repeat their silk-dropping behavior until they are dispersed by wind in a process called ballooning. While poorly tested, it is suspected that ballooning is a cause for high mortality rates. This behavior is indicated by observations seen in Endoxyla lituratus and other Lepidopteran species.

=== Tunneling ===
After ballooning for long distances, larvae will directly bore into the trunks and branches of trees of the Eucalyptus genus. They will tunnel directly into the heartwood of the tree and feed. Although some other species of the family Cossidae will instead feed underground on or within the roots of trees and shrubs, only emerging once they become adults. The entrance to their burrows is covered in silk which is then blocked by a disc composed of compacted silk and fine wood pieces. From inside the tunnel, a small hole is then chewed through the centre of this disc. When the tunnel is not in use, this small hole is plugged with wood strips.

These tunnels are initially composed of two side chambers near the entrance and one horizontal chamber excavated deeper into the tree. While in their tunnels, larva will feed on the regenerated callus tissue. As the larva grows, it further excavates and expands its feeding area, creating a deeper, vertical retreating chamber. After two years, the chamber would be between 150–250 mm in length. After approximately six months, the larva will start to lose their purple stripes. After two years, these stripes are entirely lost. By now, they would have grown to a length of 150 mm and a width of 30 mm.

=== Pupae ===
Pupation takes place in the larval tunnel after three years inside its tunnel, although pupation may happen earlier if needed. This is suspected to occur when food resources are scarce or when their host tree is snapped due to strong winds. When the larva are ready to pupate, they will modify their tunnel by turning their retreating chamber into a pupation chamber. It will clear and widen its entrance hole, chewing a larger exit hole to a diameter of around 30–40 mm. The exit hole can also have a fragile net of silk and pieces of wood hung just inside it, partially concealing the entrance. The larva will then back into its retreating tunnel and create a net of silk that is covered in a mucilaginous secretion. This secretion can have a length of 50 mm and is composed largely of a series of 3-hydroxy unsaturated fatty acids. It is suspected to have fungicidal properties and may protect the pupa from fungal infection.

The pupation period can take around 10 weeks (~70 days). Once the pupa is ready to emerge, it will start to dislodge its sawdust plug using a cutting spine on its head and dense rows of fine cuticular hooks across each abdominal segment of its exoskeleton. This allows it to grip the sides of the chamber and inch or twist forward. The plug is then pushed through the mucilaginous silken webbing in the lower half of the tunnel. Then, the pupa pushes through the exit hole where it partially protrudes out. It then splits apart dorsally for the adult moth to emerge.

=== Adulthood ===
Adults generally emerge throughout the summer time around the months of January to October. Once they crawl out, they will inflate their wings. While inflating their wings, they will produce an excess amount of meconium from their bodies. This liquid is likely a defensive spray.

Adult moths have no mouths and must rely on the fat that was gained during their larval stage.

== Ecology ==
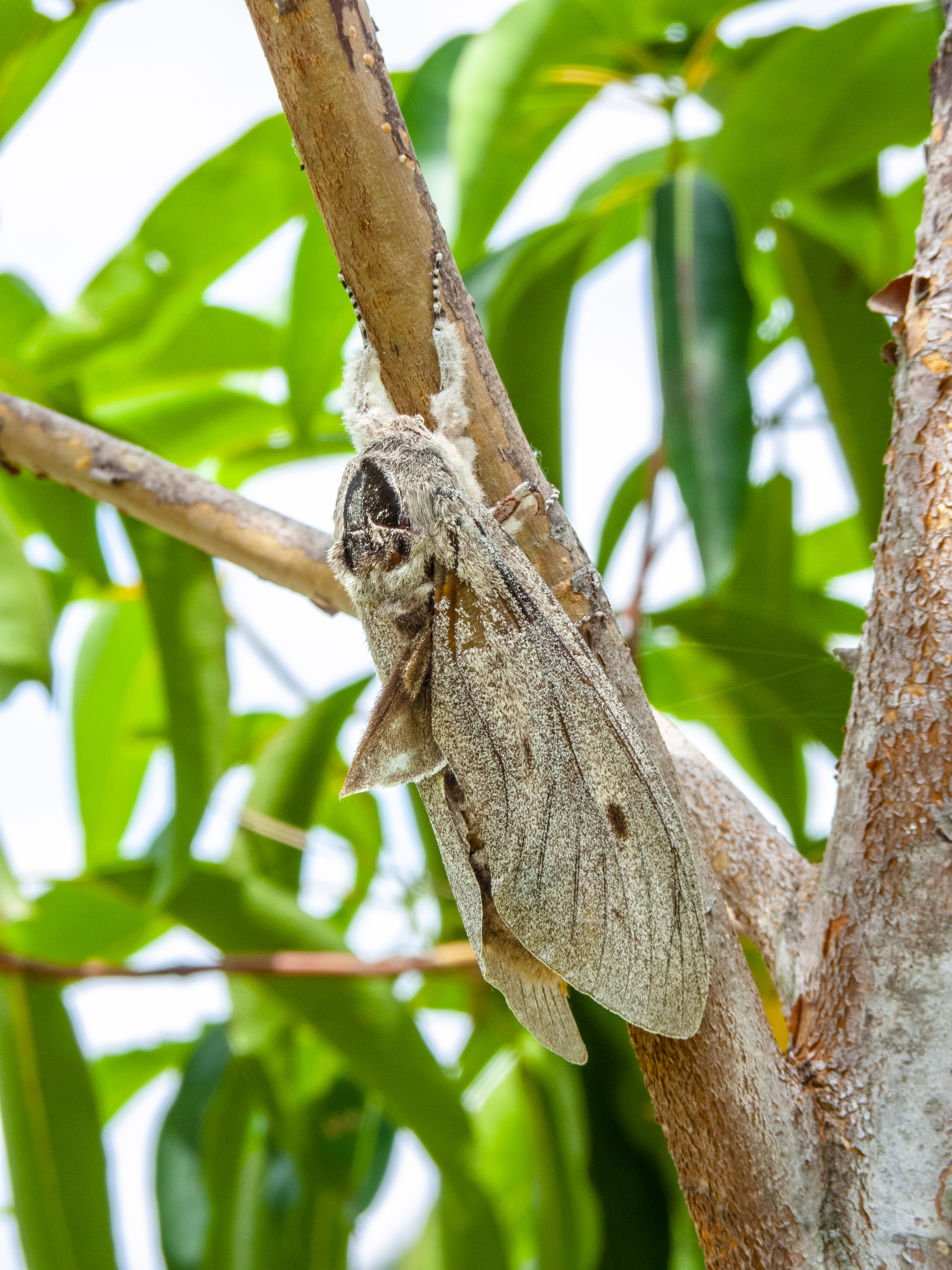
A giant wood moth located on a Eucalyptus tree.

The giant wood moth plays an important role in Australian ecosystems. Despite their importance, their ecology is poorly understood with most studies focusing on their pest behaviors.

The host plants of giant wood moths are Eucalyptus species. They prefer smooth-barked species such as Eucalyptus grandis, Eucalyptus saligna and Eucalyptus tereticornis. They can be commonly found on flooded gum trees (Eucalyptus grandis).

=== Human interaction ===
They are used as an traditional food source for Indigenous Australians.

==== Pest ====
It is seen as a major pest of Eucalyptus plantations in Australia. They are considered pests because their host species are susceptible to damage or death from giant wood moths. This is caused during the moth's larval stage where they excavate tunnels inside Eucalyptus trees over several years. Damage is aggravated, especially to trees with small diameters, from cockatoos feeding on this moth.
