= Orientozeuzera caudata =

Scientific classification
- Domain: Eukaryota
- Kingdom: Animalia
- Phylum: Arthropoda
- Class: Insecta
- Order: Lepidoptera
- Family: Cossidae
- Genus: Orientozeuzera
- Species: O. caudata

Binomial name
- Orientozeuzera caudata (Joicey et Talbot, 1916)

Synonyms
- Zeuzera caudata Joicey et Talbot, 1916

Species of moth

Orientozeuzera caudata is a moth in the family Cossidae. It was described by James John Joicey and George Talbot in 1916. It is found in New Guinea. There are also records for Japan, Malaysia, Indonesia and the Solomon Islands, but these refer to Orientozeuzera rhabdota. The habitat consists of lowland areas.
