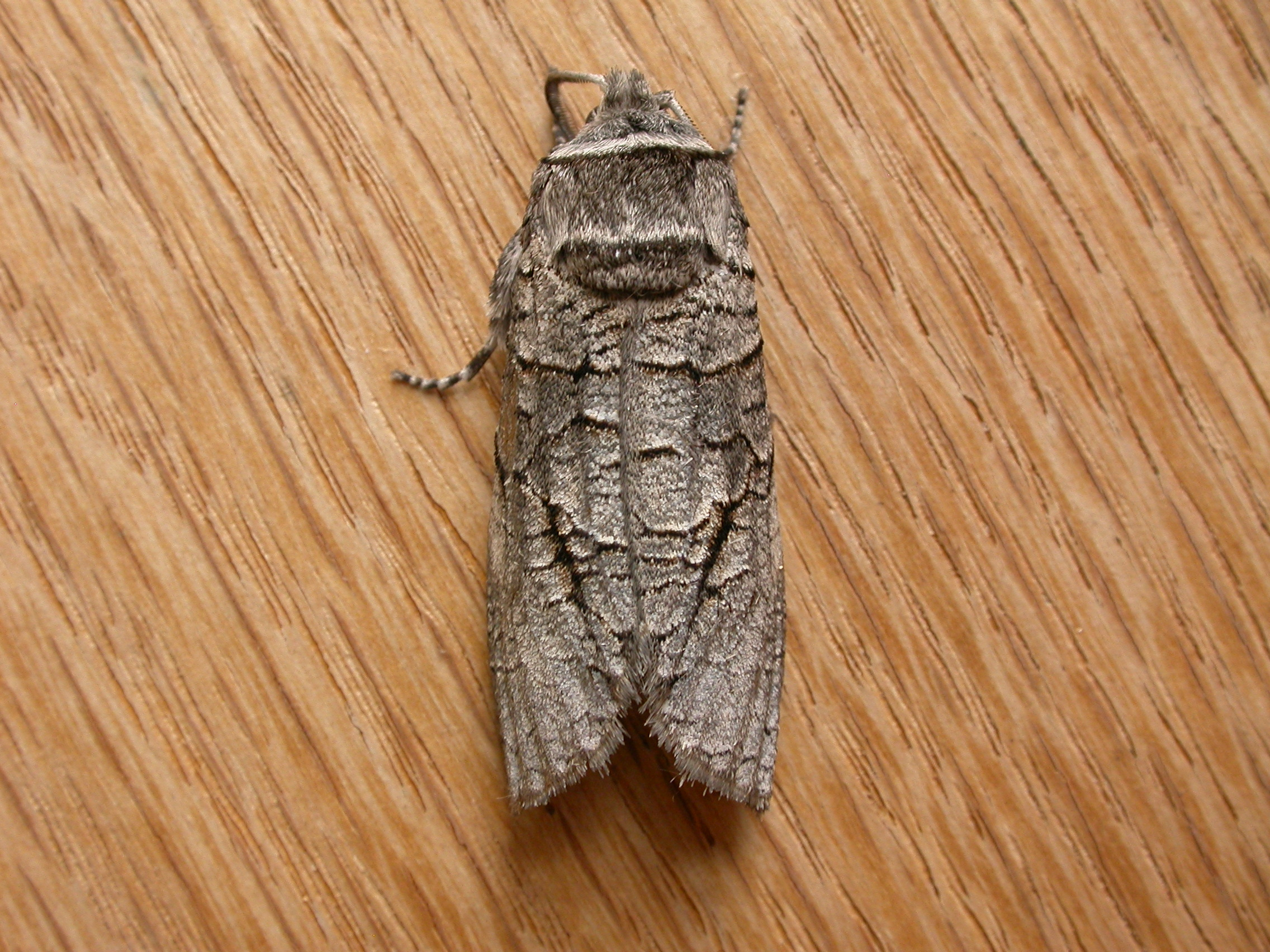
- Culama australis
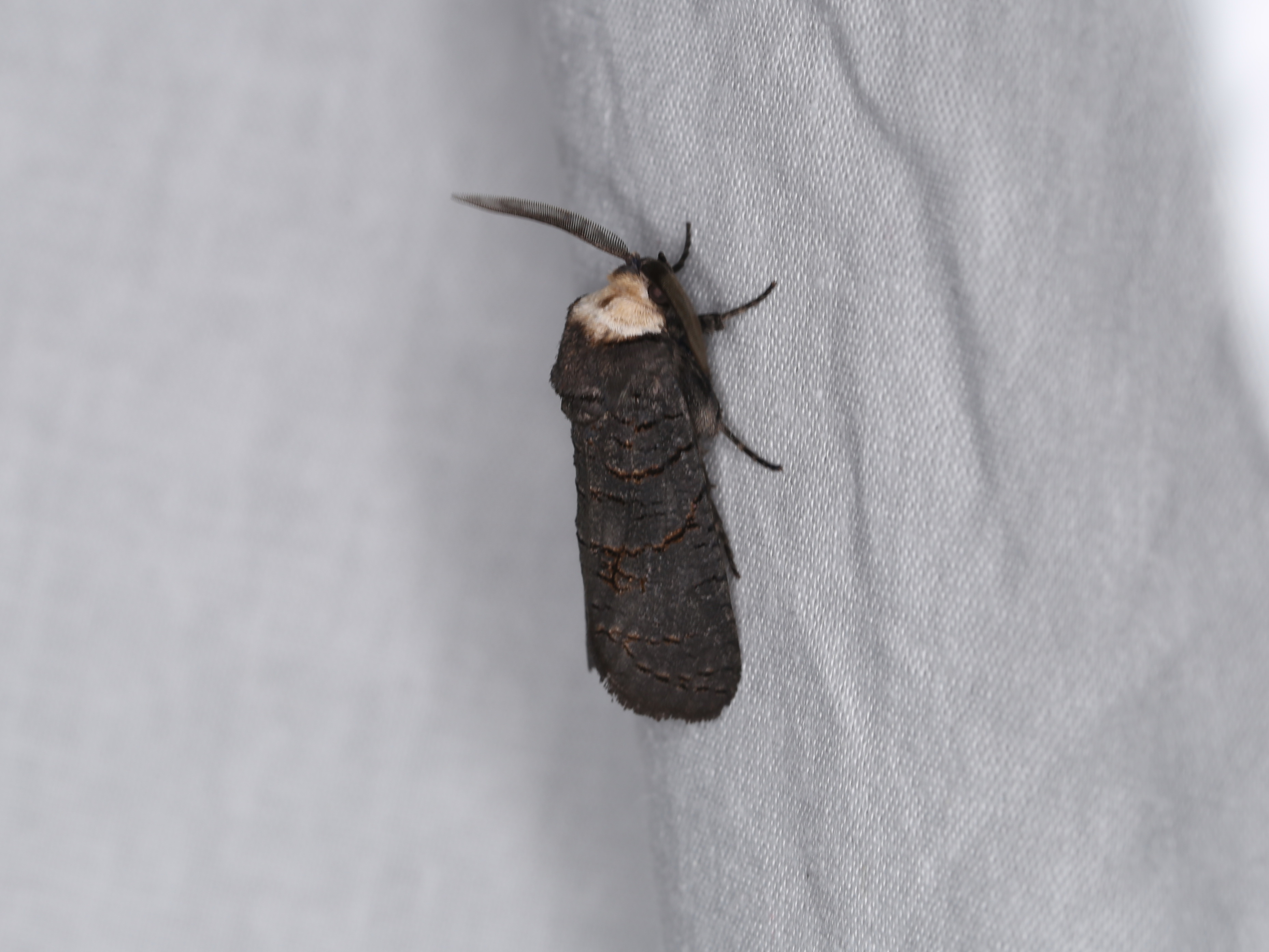
- Culama crepera

Scientific classification
- Kingdom: Animalia
- Phylum: Arthropoda
- Clade: Pancrustacea
- Class: Insecta
- Order: Lepidoptera
- Family: Cossidae
- Subfamily: Cossinae
- Tribe: incertae sedis
- Genus: Culama; Walker, 1856

Synonyms
- Pseudocossus Gaede, 1933 (preocc.)

= Culama =

Genus of moths

Culama is a genus of moths in the family Cossidae.

== Species ==
- australis species group
  - Culama anthracica Kallies & D.J. Hilton, 2012
  - Culama australis Walker, 1856 (= rhytiphorus Lower, 1893 and mesogeia Turner, 1932)
  - Culama crepera Turner, 1939
  - Culama dasythrix Turner, 1945
- suffusca species group
  - Culama alpina Kallies & D.J. Hilton, 2012
  - Culama glauca Kallies & D.J. Hilton, 2012
  - Culama suffusca Kallies & D.J. Hilton, 2012

== Former species ==
- Culama caliginosa Walker, 1856
- Culama treicleiota Bethune-Baker, 1911
