= Orientozeuzera =

Scientific classification
- Kingdom: Animalia
- Phylum: Arthropoda
- Clade: Pancrustacea
- Class: Insecta
- Order: Lepidoptera
- Family: Cossidae
- Subfamily: Zeuzerinae
- Genus: Orientozeuzera; Yakovlev, 2011

Genus of moths

Orientozeuzera is a genus of moths in the family Cossidae.

== Species ==
- Orientozeuzera aeglospila (Turner, 1915)
- Orientozeuzera brechlini Yakovlev, 2011
- Orientozeuzera caudata (Joicey et Talbot, 1916)
- Orientozeuzera celebensis (Roepke, 1957)
- Orientozeuzera halmahera Yakovlev, 2011
- Orientozeuzera meyi Yakovlev, 2011
- Orientozeuzera postexcisa (Hampson, 1893)
- Orientozeuzera quieta Turner, 1932
- Orientozeuzera rhabdota (Jordan, 1932)
- Orientozeuzera roepkei Yakovlev, 2011
- Orientozeuzera shiva Yakovlev, 2011
- Orientozeuzera sympatrica Yakovlev, 2011
