= Skeletophyllon perdrix =

Scientific classification
- Domain: Eukaryota
- Kingdom: Animalia
- Phylum: Arthropoda
- Class: Insecta
- Order: Lepidoptera
- Family: Cossidae
- Genus: Skeletophyllon
- Species: S. perdrix

Binomial name
- Skeletophyllon perdrix (Roepke, 1955)

Synonyms
- Xyleutes perdrix Roepke, 1955

Species of moth

Skeletophyllon perdrix is a moth in the family Cossidae. It was described by Roepke in 1955. It is found in New Guinea.
