= Skeletophyllon euphyes =

Scientific classification
- Domain: Eukaryota
- Kingdom: Animalia
- Phylum: Arthropoda
- Class: Insecta
- Order: Lepidoptera
- Family: Cossidae
- Genus: Skeletophyllon
- Species: S. euphyes

Binomial name
- Skeletophyllon euphyes (West, 1932)

Synonyms
- Xyleutes euphyes West, 1932

Species of moth

Skeletophyllon euphyes is a moth in the family Cossidae. It was described by West in 1932. It is found in Malaysia and Thailand and on Sumatra, Borneo, the Philippines and Sulawesi.
