= Archaeoses =

Scientific classification
- Kingdom: Animalia
- Phylum: Arthropoda
- Class: Insecta
- Order: Lepidoptera
- Family: Cossidae
- Genus: Archaeoses; Turner, 1932

Species
- See text

Synonyms
- Astaropola Meyrick, 1936

Moth genus in family Cossidae

Archaeoses is a genus of moths belonging to the family Cossidae.

== Species ==
- Archaeoses magicosema (Meyrick, 1936)
- Archaeoses pentasema (Lower, 1915)
- Archaeoses polygrapha (Lower, 1893)
