= Orientozeuzera postexcisa =

Scientific classification
- Kingdom: Animalia
- Phylum: Arthropoda
- Class: Insecta
- Order: Lepidoptera
- Family: Cossidae
- Genus: Orientozeuzera
- Species: O. postexcisa

Binomial name
- Orientozeuzera postexcisa (Hampson, 1893)

Synonyms
- Zeuzera postexcisa Hampson, 1893

Species of moth

Orientozeuzera postexcisa is a moth in the family Cossidae. It was described by George Hampson in 1893. It is found in Sri Lanka and possibly southern India.

== Description ==
Hindwings with the outer margin deeply excised near the anal angle. In the male, the head, thorax and abdomen are white. Collar with paired blue-black marks. Tegulae with a blue-black spot. All three segments of the thorax are with paired blue-black blotches, where the meta-thorax has an additional spot on the vertex. The abdomen has blue-black marks at sides and on vertex. Forewings are white with numerous small round blue-black spots. The cell with few spots and those beyond it is obsolescent. The marginal series is prominent. Hindwings are also white with some small obsolescent spots beyond the cell and some prominent blue-black spots on the outer margin, those at the excision conjoined into a prominent band.
