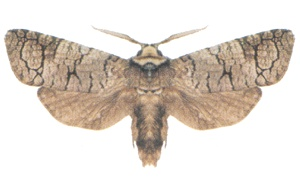
- Zyganisus caliginosus

Scientific classification
- Kingdom: Animalia
- Phylum: Arthropoda
- Clade: Pancrustacea
- Class: Insecta
- Order: Lepidoptera
- Family: Cossidae
- Genus: Zyganisus; Viette, 1951

Synonyms
- Pseudocossus Gaede, 1933 (nec Kenrick, 1914)

= Zyganisus =

Genus of moths

Zyganisus is a genus of moths in the family Cossidae.

== Species ==
- Zyganisus cadigalorum Kallies & D.J. Hilton, 2012
- Zyganisus caliginosus (Walker, 1856)
- Zyganisus fulvicollis (Gaede, 1933)
- Zyganisus propedia Kallies & D.J. Hilton, 2012
- Zyganisus acalanthis Kallies & D.J. Hilton, 2012
