= Skeletophyllon sibolgae =

Scientific classification
- Domain: Eukaryota
- Kingdom: Animalia
- Phylum: Arthropoda
- Class: Insecta
- Order: Lepidoptera
- Family: Cossidae
- Genus: Skeletophyllon
- Species: S. sibolgae

Binomial name
- Skeletophyllon sibolgae (Roepke, 1957)

Synonyms
- Xyleutes sibolgae Roepke, 1957

Species of moth

Skeletophyllon sibolgae is a moth in the family Cossidae. It was described by Roepke in 1957. It is found in Malaysia and on Sumatra and Sulawesi.
