= Endoxyla nebulosa =

Scientific classification
- Kingdom: Animalia
- Phylum: Arthropoda
- Clade: Pancrustacea
- Class: Insecta
- Order: Lepidoptera
- Family: Cossidae
- Genus: Endoxyla
- Species: E. nebulosa

Binomial name
- Endoxyla nebulosa (Donovan, 1805)

Synonyms
- Cossus nebulosus Donovan, 1805; Endoxyla nebulosus

Species of moth

Endoxyla nebulosa is a moth in the family Cossidae. It is found in Australia, where it has been recorded from New South Wales.
