= Skeletophyllon dictyograpta =

Scientific classification
- Domain: Eukaryota
- Kingdom: Animalia
- Phylum: Arthropoda
- Class: Insecta
- Order: Lepidoptera
- Family: Cossidae
- Genus: Skeletophyllon
- Species: S. dictyograpta

Binomial name
- Skeletophyllon dictyograpta (Roepke, 1957)

Synonyms
- Xyleutes dictyograpta Roepke, 1957

Species of moth

Skeletophyllon dictyograpta is a moth in the family Cossidae. It was described by Roepke in 1957. It is found on Borneo and Java. The habitat consists of lowland mangrove forests, swamp forests and dry heath forests.
