= Skeletophyllon =

Scientific classification
- Kingdom: Animalia
- Phylum: Arthropoda
- Clade: Pancrustacea
- Class: Insecta
- Order: Lepidoptera
- Family: Cossidae
- Subfamily: Zeuzerinae
- Genus: Skeletophyllon; Schoorl, 1990

Genus of moths

Skeletophyllon is a genus of moths in the family Cossidae.

== Species ==
- Skeletophyllon andamani Yakovlev, 2011
- Skeletophyllon dictyograpta (Roepke, 1957)
- Skeletophyllon euphyes (West, 1932)
- Skeletophyllon friedeli Yakovlev, 2006
- Skeletophyllon hanuman Yakovlev, 2011
- Skeletophyllon kalinini Yakovlev, 2011
- Skeletophyllon kalisi (Roepke, 1957)
- Skeletophyllon kshatrij Yakovlev, 2011
- Skeletophyllon pallida Yakovlev, 2011
- Skeletophyllon perdrix (Roepke, 1955)
- Skeletophyllon puer Yakovlev, 2006
- Skeletophyllon sibolgae (Roepke, 1957)
- Skeletophyllon tarasovi Yakovlev, 2011
- Skeletophyllon tempestua (Lucas, 1898)
- Skeletophyllon wetarensis Yakovlev, 2011
