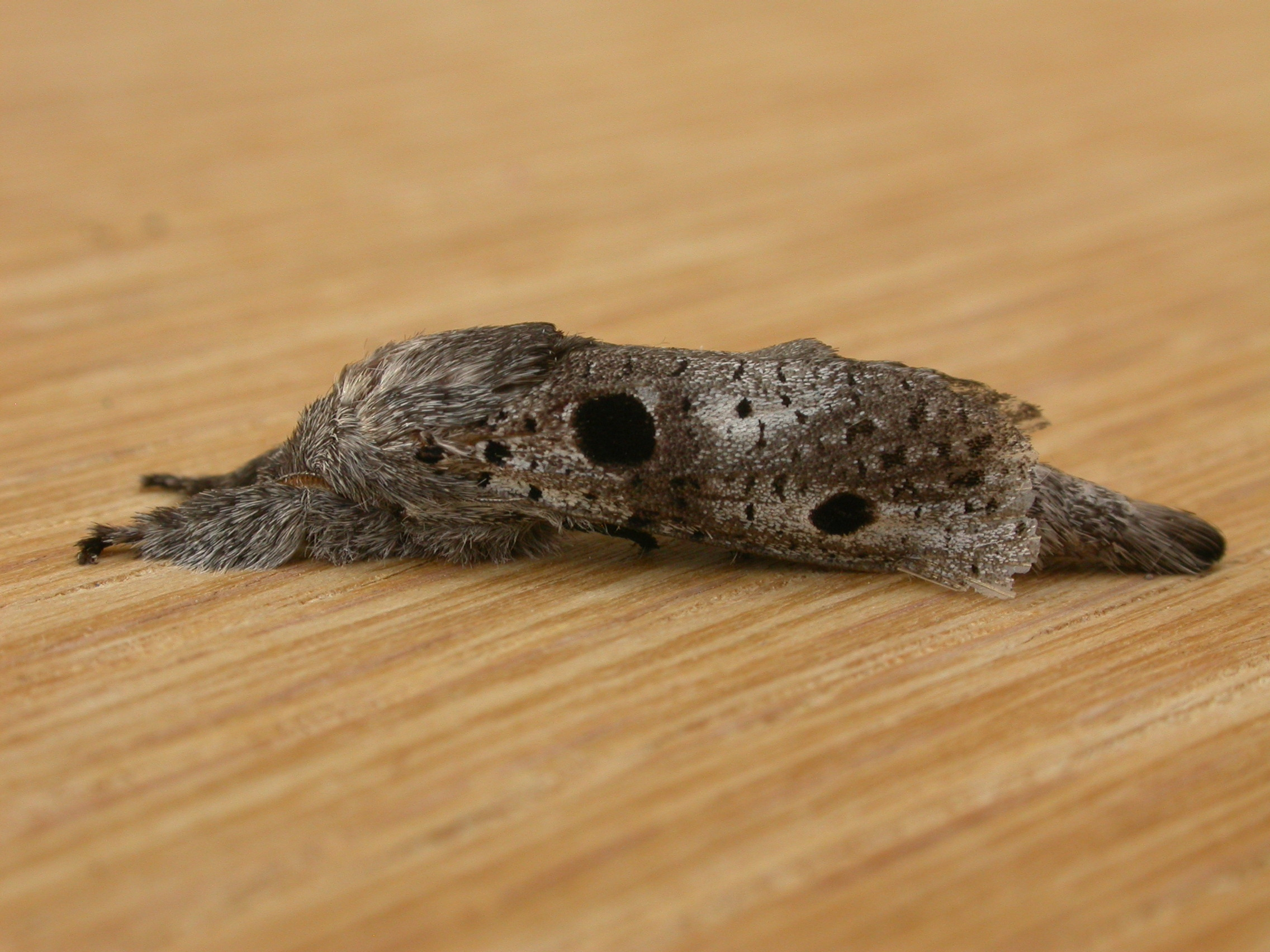
- Endoxyla species

Scientific classification
- Kingdom: Animalia
- Phylum: Arthropoda
- Clade: Pancrustacea
- Class: Insecta
- Order: Lepidoptera
- Family: Cossidae
- Subfamily: Zeuzerinae
- Tribe: Xyleutini
- Genus: Endoxyla; Herrich-Schäffer, 1855

Synonyms
- Eudoxyla Heylaerts, 1886; Luzoniella Yakovlev, 2006; Xyrena Herrich-Schäffer, 1854; Cossimorphus Houlbert, 1916; Dictyocossus Houlbert, 1916; Melanocossus Houlbert, 1916

= Endoxyla (moth) =

Genus of moths

Endoxyla is a genus of moths in the family Cossidae and are found in Australia.

== Species ==
- Endoxyla acontucha
- Endoxyla affinis
- Endoxyla amphiplecta
- Endoxyla angasii
- Endoxyla biarpiti
- Endoxyla bipustulata
- Endoxyla celebesa
- Endoxyla cinereus
- Endoxyla columbina
- Endoxyla coscinopa
- Endoxyla coscinophanes
- Endoxyla coscinota
- Endoxyla decorata
- Endoxyla dictyoschema
- Endoxyla didymoplaca
- Endoxyla donovani
- Endoxyla duponchelli
- Endoxyla edwardsi
- Endoxyla eluta
- Endoxyla encalypti
- Endoxyla episticha
- Endoxyla eremonoma
- Endoxyla eumitra
- Endoxyla euplecta
- Endoxyla euryphaea
- Endoxyla fusca
- Endoxyla grisea
- Endoxyla houlberti
- Endoxyla interlucens
- Endoxyla leucomochla
- Endoxyla lichenea
- Endoxyla lituratus
- Endoxyla mackeri
- Endoxyla macleayi
- Endoxyla magnifica
- Endoxyla magniguttata
- Endoxyla methychroa
- Endoxyla meyi
- Endoxyla minutiscripta
- Endoxyla nebulosa
- Endoxyla nephocosma
- Endoxyla neuroxantha
- Endoxyla nubila
- Endoxyla opposita
- Endoxyla perigypsa
- Endoxyla phaeocosma
- Endoxyla polyplecta
- Endoxyla polyploca
- Endoxyla pulchra
- Endoxyla punctifimbria
- Endoxyla reticulosa
- Endoxyla secta
- Endoxyla sordida
- Endoxyla stenoptila
- Endoxyla tanyctena
- Endoxyla tenebrifer
- Endoxyla tigrina
- Endoxyla turneri
- Endoxyla vittata
- Endoxyla zophoplecta
- Endoxyla zophospila
