= Endoxyla fusca =

Scientific classification
- Kingdom: Animalia
- Phylum: Arthropoda
- Clade: Pancrustacea
- Class: Insecta
- Order: Lepidoptera
- Family: Cossidae
- Genus: Endoxyla
- Species: E. fusca

Binomial name
- Endoxyla fusca (C. Swinhoe, 1892)

Synonyms
- Strigoides fuscus C. Swinhoe, 1892; Endoxyla fuscus

Species of moth

Endoxyla fusca is a moth in the family Cossidae first described by Charles Swinhoe in 1892. It is found in Australia, where it has been recorded from Queensland.
