= Skeletophyllon wetarensis =

Scientific classification
- Kingdom: Animalia
- Phylum: Arthropoda
- Clade: Pancrustacea
- Class: Insecta
- Order: Lepidoptera
- Family: Cossidae
- Genus: Skeletophyllon
- Species: S. wetarensis

Binomial name
- Skeletophyllon wetarensis Yakovlev, 2011

Species of moth

Skeletophyllon wetarensis is a moth in the family Cossidae. It was described by Yakovlev in 2011. It is found on the Moluccas.
