= Endoxyla meyi =

Scientific classification
- Kingdom: Animalia
- Phylum: Arthropoda
- Clade: Pancrustacea
- Class: Insecta
- Order: Lepidoptera
- Family: Cossidae
- Genus: Endoxyla
- Species: E. meyi

Binomial name
- Endoxyla meyi (Yakovlev, 2006)

Synonyms
- Luzoniella meyi Yakovlev, 2006

Species of moth

Endoxyla meyi is a moth in the family Cossidae. It is found in the Philippines (Luzon).

The length of the forewings is about 45 mm. The forewings are dark-brown with dark-brown strokes. The hindwings are light-brown, with a weak pattern of dark-brown strokes in the costal areas.

== Etymology ==
The species is named in honour of Dr. Wolfram Mey.
