= Skeletophyllon puer =

Scientific classification
- Kingdom: Animalia
- Phylum: Arthropoda
- Clade: Pancrustacea
- Class: Insecta
- Order: Lepidoptera
- Family: Cossidae
- Genus: Skeletophyllon
- Species: S. puer

Binomial name
- Skeletophyllon puer Yakovlev, 2006

Species of moth

Skeletophyllon puer is a moth in the family Cossidae. It was described by Yakovlev in 2006. It is found in northern Sumatra.

The length of the forewings is about 11 mm.

== Etymology ==
The species name is derived from Latin puer (meaning a child).
