= Macrocyttara =

Scientific classification
- Kingdom: Animalia
- Phylum: Arthropoda
- Class: Insecta
- Order: Lepidoptera
- Family: Cossidae
- Subfamily: Cossinae
- Genus: Macrocyttara; Turner, 1918

Genus of moths

Macrocyttara is a genus of moths in the family Cossidae.

== Species ==
- Macrocyttara expressa T.P. Lucas, 1902
- Macrocyttara pamphaea Turner, 1945
