= Sympycnodes =

Scientific classification
- Domain: Eukaryota
- Kingdom: Animalia
- Phylum: Arthropoda
- Class: Insecta
- Order: Lepidoptera
- Family: Cossidae
- Subfamily: Zeuzerinae
- Genus: Sympycnodes; Turner, 1932

Genus of moths

Sympycnodes is a genus of moths in the family Cossidae.

== Species ==
- unnamed group
  - Sympycnodes rhaptodes Turner, 1942
  - Sympycnodes tripartita (T.P. Lucas, 1892) (=Sympycnodes trigonocosma Turner, 1932)
- epicycla group
  - Sympycnodes epicycla (Turner, 1945)
  - Sympycnodes arachnophora (Turner, 1945)
- digitata group
  - Sympycnodes adrienneae Kallies & D.J. Hilton, 2012
  - Sympycnodes digitata Kallies & D.J. Hilton, 2012
  - Sympycnodes dunnorum Kallies & D.J. Hilton, 2012
  - Sympycnodes interstincta Kallies & D.J. Hilton, 2012
  - Sympycnodes salterra Kallies & D.J. Hilton, 2012
  - Sympycnodes uptoni Kallies & D.J. Hilton, 2012
