= Skeletophyllon friedeli =

Scientific classification
- Kingdom: Animalia
- Phylum: Arthropoda
- Clade: Pancrustacea
- Class: Insecta
- Order: Lepidoptera
- Family: Cossidae
- Genus: Skeletophyllon
- Species: S. friedeli

Binomial name
- Skeletophyllon friedeli Yakovlev, 2006

Species of moth

Skeletophyllon friedeli is a moth in the family Cossidae. It was described by Yakovlev in 2006. It is found in southern Thailand.

The length of the forewings is 16.5–18 mm.

== Etymology ==
The species is named in honour of G. Friedel.
