= Orientozeuzera sympatrica =

Scientific classification
- Kingdom: Animalia
- Phylum: Arthropoda
- Clade: Pancrustacea
- Class: Insecta
- Order: Lepidoptera
- Family: Cossidae
- Genus: Orientozeuzera
- Species: O. sympatrica

Binomial name
- Orientozeuzera sympatrica Yakovlev, 2011

Species of moth

Orientozeuzera sympatrica is a moth in the family Cossidae. It was described by Yakovlev in 2011. It is found in southern Myanmar.
