= Endoxyla celebesa =

Scientific classification
- Kingdom: Animalia
- Phylum: Arthropoda
- Clade: Pancrustacea
- Class: Insecta
- Order: Lepidoptera
- Family: Cossidae
- Genus: Endoxyla
- Species: E. celebesa

Binomial name
- Endoxyla celebesa (Walker, 1865)

Synonyms
- Zeuzera celebesa Walker, 1865

Species of moth

Endoxyla celebesa is a moth in the family Cossidae. It is found on Sulawesi.
