= Skeletophyllon tarasovi =

Scientific classification
- Kingdom: Animalia
- Phylum: Arthropoda
- Clade: Pancrustacea
- Class: Insecta
- Order: Lepidoptera
- Family: Cossidae
- Genus: Skeletophyllon
- Species: S. tarasovi

Binomial name
- Skeletophyllon tarasovi Yakovlev, 2011

Species of moth

Skeletophyllon tarasovi is a moth in the family Cossidae. It was described by Yakovlev in 2011. It is found on the Moluccas.
