= Orientozeuzera quieta =

Scientific classification
- Domain: Eukaryota
- Kingdom: Animalia
- Phylum: Arthropoda
- Class: Insecta
- Order: Lepidoptera
- Family: Cossidae
- Genus: Orientozeuzera
- Species: O. quieta

Binomial name
- Orientozeuzera quieta (Turner, 1932)

Synonyms
- Zeuzera quieta Turner, 1932

Species of moth

Orientozeuzera quieta is a moth in the family Cossidae. It was described by Turner in 1932. It is found in Australia, where it has been recorded from Queensland and north-west Australia.
