= Endoxyla neuroxantha =

Scientific classification
- Kingdom: Animalia
- Phylum: Arthropoda
- Clade: Pancrustacea
- Class: Insecta
- Order: Lepidoptera
- Family: Cossidae
- Genus: Endoxyla
- Species: E. neuroxantha

Binomial name
- Endoxyla neuroxantha (Lower, 1900)

Synonyms
- Zeuzera neuroxantha Lower, 1900; Xyleutes spilota Turner, 1936; Xyleutes plocistis Turner, 1945

Species of moth found in Australia

Endoxyla neuroxantha is a moth in the family Cossidae. It is found in Australia, where it has been recorded from Queensland, New South Wales and South Australia.
