= Sympycnodes tripartita =

Scientific classification
- Domain: Eukaryota
- Kingdom: Animalia
- Phylum: Arthropoda
- Class: Insecta
- Order: Lepidoptera
- Family: Cossidae
- Genus: Sympycnodes
- Species: S. tripartita

Binomial name
- Sympycnodes tripartita (Lucas, 1892)

Synonyms
- Zeuzera tripartita Lucas, 1892; Sympycnodes trigonocosma Turner, 1932

Species of moth

Sympycnodes tripartita is a species of moth of the family Cossidae. It is found in Australia, where it has been recorded from northern New South Wales to southern Queensland where it occurs at altitudes up to 1,000 meters.

The wingspan is 33–49 mm for males and 65 mm for females. Adults have been recorded on wing from December to the beginning of April.
