= Endoxyla edwardsi =

Scientific classification
- Kingdom: Animalia
- Phylum: Arthropoda
- Clade: Pancrustacea
- Class: Insecta
- Order: Lepidoptera
- Family: Cossidae
- Genus: Endoxyla
- Species: E. edwardsi

Binomial name
- Endoxyla edwardsi (Tepper, 1891)

Synonyms
- Cossus edwardsi Tepper, 1891

Species of moth

Endoxyla edwardsi is a species of moth of the family Cossidae. It is found in Australia, where it has been recorded from Queensland and Victoria.
