= Culama dasythrix =

Scientific classification
- Domain: Eukaryota
- Kingdom: Animalia
- Phylum: Arthropoda
- Class: Insecta
- Order: Lepidoptera
- Family: Cossidae
- Genus: Culama
- Species: C. dasythrix

Binomial name
- Culama dasythrix Turner, 1945

Species of moth

Culama dasythrix is a moth in the family Cossidae. It was described by Alfred Jefferis Turner in 1945. It is found in Australia, where it has been recorded in southern Western Australia.

The wingspan is 37–39 mm. Adults have been recorded on wing in April and September.
