= Endoxyla methychroa =

Scientific classification
- Kingdom: Animalia
- Phylum: Arthropoda
- Clade: Pancrustacea
- Class: Insecta
- Order: Lepidoptera
- Family: Cossidae
- Genus: Endoxyla
- Species: E. methychroa

Binomial name
- Endoxyla methychroa (Turner, 1911)

Synonyms
- Xyleutes methychroa Turner, 1911

Species of moth found in Australia

Endoxyla methychroa is a moth in the family Cossidae. It is found in Australia, where it has been recorded from Northern Australia and Queensland.
