= Endoxyla amphiplecta =

Scientific classification
- Kingdom: Animalia
- Phylum: Arthropoda
- Clade: Pancrustacea
- Class: Insecta
- Order: Lepidoptera
- Family: Cossidae
- Genus: Endoxyla
- Species: E. amphiplecta

Binomial name
- Endoxyla amphiplecta (Turner, 1932)

Synonyms
- Xyleutes amphiplecta Turner, 1932

Species of moth

Endoxyla amphiplecta is a species of moth of the family Cossidae. It is found in Australia, where it has been recorded from Queensland, New South Wales and Victoria.

The wingspan of the males is about 50 mm.

The larvae have been recorded feeding on the roots of Pachycornia triandra and Bassia hyssopifolia.
