= Endoxyla punctifimbria =

Scientific classification
- Kingdom: Animalia
- Phylum: Arthropoda
- Clade: Pancrustacea
- Class: Insecta
- Order: Lepidoptera
- Family: Cossidae
- Genus: Endoxyla
- Species: E. punctifimbria

Binomial name
- Endoxyla punctifimbria (Walker, 1865)

Synonyms
- Zeuzera punctifimbria Walker, 1865; Xyleutes polyspora Turner, 1945

Species of moth

Endoxyla punctifimbria is a moth in the family Cossidae. It is found in Australia, where it has been recorded from Queensland, Western Australia and South Australia.
