= Endoxyla polyploca =

Scientific classification
- Kingdom: Animalia
- Phylum: Arthropoda
- Clade: Pancrustacea
- Class: Insecta
- Order: Lepidoptera
- Family: Cossidae
- Genus: Endoxyla
- Species: E. polyploca

Binomial name
- Endoxyla polyploca (Turner, 1911)

Synonyms
- Xyleutes polyploca Turner, 1911; Xyleutes polioploca Dalla-Torre, 1923

Species of moth

Endoxyla polyploca is a moth in the family Cossidae. It is found in Australia, where it has been recorded from Queensland and Northern Australia.
