= Sympycnodes adrienneae =

Scientific classification
- Domain: Eukaryota
- Kingdom: Animalia
- Phylum: Arthropoda
- Class: Insecta
- Order: Lepidoptera
- Family: Cossidae
- Genus: Sympycnodes
- Species: S. adrienneae

Binomial name
- Sympycnodes adrienneae Kallies & D.J. Hilton, 2012

Species of moth

Sympycnodes adrienneae is a species of moth of the family Cossidae. It is found in Australia, where it has been recorded from the dry inland mallee of Victoria and New South Wales.

The wingspan is 38 mm for males and 40 mm for females.
