= Endoxyla coscinota =

Scientific classification
- Kingdom: Animalia
- Phylum: Arthropoda
- Clade: Pancrustacea
- Class: Insecta
- Order: Lepidoptera
- Family: Cossidae
- Genus: Endoxyla
- Species: E. coscinota

Binomial name
- Endoxyla coscinota (Turner, 1903)

Synonyms
- Xyleutes coscinota Turner, 1903; Xyleutes doddi Rothschild, 1903

Species of moth

Endoxyla coscinota is a moth in the family Cossidae. It is found in Australia, where it has been recorded from Queensland.
