= Sympycnodes uptoni =

Scientific classification
- Domain: Eukaryota
- Kingdom: Animalia
- Phylum: Arthropoda
- Class: Insecta
- Order: Lepidoptera
- Family: Cossidae
- Genus: Sympycnodes
- Species: S. uptoni

Binomial name
- Sympycnodes uptoni Kallies & D.J. Hilton, 2012

Species of moth

Sympycnodes uptoni is a species of moth of the family Cossidae. It is found in Australia, where it has been recorded from northern Western Australia.

The wingspan is 27–42 mm for males.

== Etymology ==
The species is named in honour of Murray Upton who collected the type series.
