= Endoxyla sordida =

Scientific classification
- Kingdom: Animalia
- Phylum: Arthropoda
- Clade: Pancrustacea
- Class: Insecta
- Order: Lepidoptera
- Family: Cossidae
- Genus: Endoxyla
- Species: E. sordida

Binomial name
- Endoxyla sordida (Rothschild, 1896)

Synonyms
- Xyleutes sordida Rothschild, 1896

Species of moth

Endoxyla sordida is a moth in the family Cossidae. It is found in Australia, where it has been recorded from Queensland and Victoria.
