= Endoxyla mackeri =

Scientific classification
- Kingdom: Animalia
- Phylum: Arthropoda
- Clade: Pancrustacea
- Class: Insecta
- Order: Lepidoptera
- Family: Cossidae
- Genus: Endoxyla
- Species: E. mackeri

Binomial name
- Endoxyla mackeri (Oberthur, 1916)

Synonyms
- Xyleutes mackeri Oberthur, 1916

Species of moth

Endoxyla mackeri is a moth in the family Cossidae. It is found in Australia, where it has been recorded from Queensland.
