= Zyganisus cadigalorum =

Scientific classification
- Kingdom: Animalia
- Phylum: Arthropoda
- Clade: Pancrustacea
- Class: Insecta
- Order: Lepidoptera
- Family: Cossidae
- Genus: Zyganisus
- Species: Z. cadigalorum

Binomial name
- Zyganisus cadigalorum Kallies & Hilton, 2012

Species of moth

Zyganisus cadigalorum is a moth in the family Cossidae, and was first described in 2012 by Axel Kallies and Douglas J. Hilton.

It is found in New South Wales, Australia, where it has been recorded from the Sydney area.

The wingspan is 41–62 mm for males and 59–65 mm for females. Adults are on wing from late April to mid-July.

== Etymology ==
The species name is a Latin plural genitive of Cadigal and thus describes the genus as being of the Cadigal people.
