= Endoxyla grisea =

Scientific classification
- Kingdom: Animalia
- Phylum: Arthropoda
- Clade: Pancrustacea
- Class: Insecta
- Order: Lepidoptera
- Family: Cossidae
- Genus: Endoxyla
- Species: E. grisea

Binomial name
- Endoxyla grisea (Gaede, 1933)

Synonyms
- Xyleutes grisea Gaede, 1933

Species of moth

Endoxyla grisea is a moth in the family Cossidae. It is found in Australia, where it has been recorded from Northern Australia.
