= Orientozeuzera celebensis =

Scientific classification
- Domain: Eukaryota
- Kingdom: Animalia
- Phylum: Arthropoda
- Class: Insecta
- Order: Lepidoptera
- Family: Cossidae
- Genus: Orientozeuzera
- Species: O. celebensis

Binomial name
- Orientozeuzera celebensis (Roepke, 1957)

Synonyms
- Zeuzera celebensis Roepke, 1957

Species of moth

Orientozeuzera celebensis is a moth in the family Cossidae. It was described by Roepke in 1957. It is found on Sulawesi.
