= Endoxyla minutiscripta =

Scientific classification
- Kingdom: Animalia
- Phylum: Arthropoda
- Clade: Pancrustacea
- Class: Insecta
- Order: Lepidoptera
- Family: Cossidae
- Genus: Endoxyla
- Species: E. minutiscripta

Binomial name
- Endoxyla minutiscripta Lucas, 1898

Synonyms
- Eudoxyla (Zeuzera) minutiscripta Lucas, 1898

Species of moth found in Australia

Endoxyla minutiscripta is a moth in the family Cossidae. It is found in Australia, where it has been recorded from Queensland.
