= Archaeoses pentasema =

Scientific classification
- Kingdom: Animalia
- Phylum: Arthropoda
- Class: Insecta
- Order: Lepidoptera
- Family: Cossidae
- Genus: Archaeoses
- Species: A. pentasema

Binomial name
- Archaeoses pentasema (Lower, 1915)

Synonyms
- Zeuzera pentasema Lower, 1915; Archaeoses neurotenes Turner, 1932

Species of moth

Archaeoses pentasema is a moth in the family Cossidae. It is found in Australia, where it has been recorded from Queensland.
