= Endoxyla turneri =

Scientific classification
- Kingdom: Animalia
- Phylum: Arthropoda
- Clade: Pancrustacea
- Class: Insecta
- Order: Lepidoptera
- Family: Cossidae
- Genus: Endoxyla
- Species: E. turneri

Binomial name
- Endoxyla turneri (Roepke, 1955)

Synonyms
- Xyleutes turneri Roepke, 1955; Xyleutes leucolopha Turner, 1945

Species of moth

Endoxyla turneri is a moth in the family Cossidae. It is found in Australia, where it has been recorded from Queensland.
