= Endoxyla zophoplecta =

Scientific classification
- Kingdom: Animalia
- Phylum: Arthropoda
- Clade: Pancrustacea
- Class: Insecta
- Order: Lepidoptera
- Family: Cossidae
- Genus: Endoxyla
- Species: E. zophoplecta

Binomial name
- Endoxyla zophoplecta (Turner, 1902)

Synonyms
- Xyleutes zophoplecta Turner, 1902

Species of moth

Endoxyla zophoplecta is a moth in the family Cossidae. It is found in Australia, where it has been recorded from Northern Australia and Queensland.
