= Endoxyla affinis =

Scientific classification
- Kingdom: Animalia
- Phylum: Arthropoda
- Clade: Pancrustacea
- Class: Insecta
- Order: Lepidoptera
- Family: Cossidae
- Genus: Endoxyla
- Species: E. affinis

Binomial name
- Endoxyla affinis (Rothschild, 1896)

Synonyms
- Xyleutes affinis Rothschild, 1896

Species of moth

Endoxyla affinis is a species of moth of the family Cossidae. It is found in Australia, where it has been recorded from Queensland and New South Wales.
