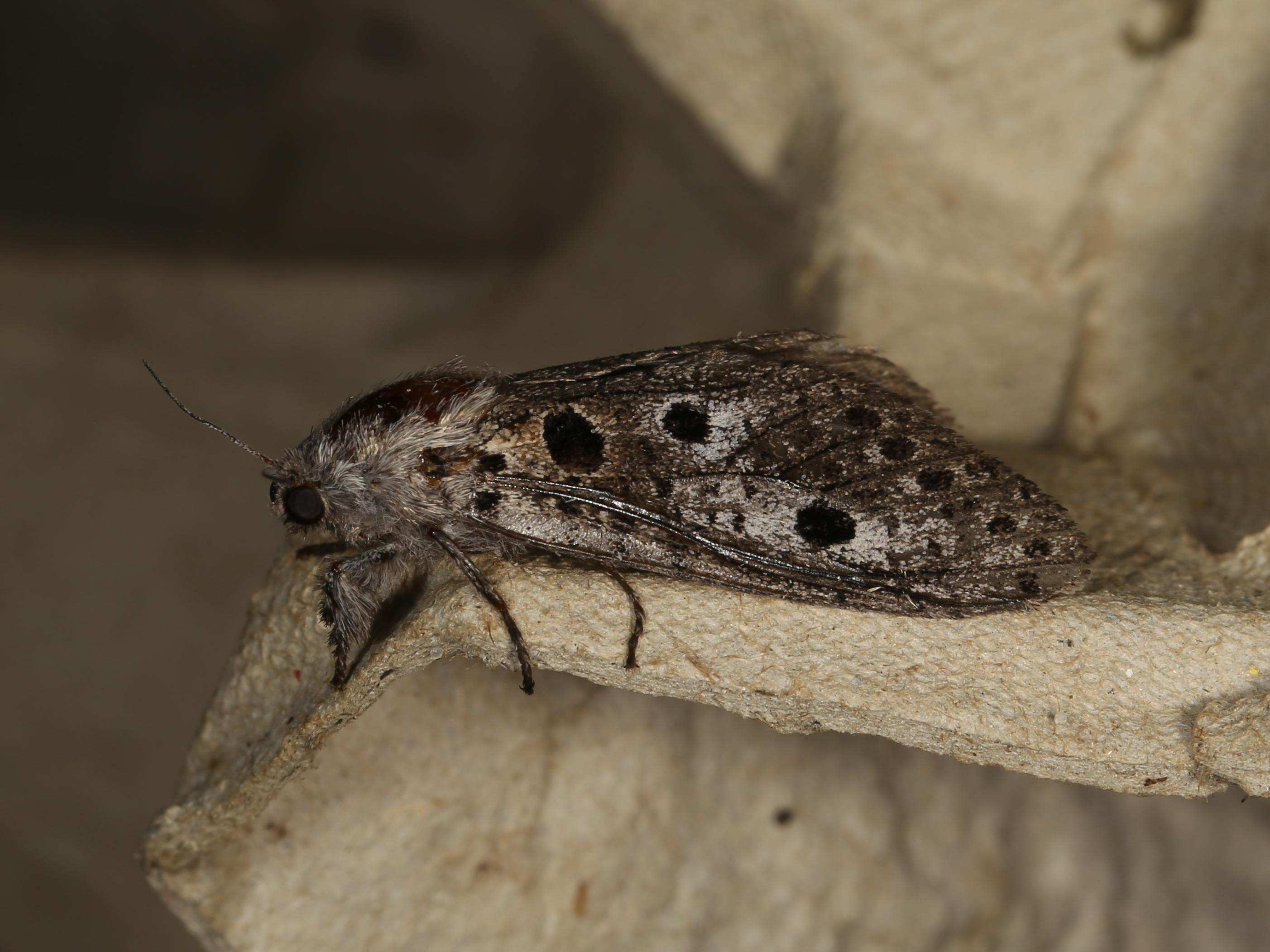

Scientific classification
- Kingdom: Animalia
- Phylum: Arthropoda
- Class: Insecta
- Order: Lepidoptera
- Family: Cossidae
- Genus: Sympycnodes
- Species: S. epicycla

Binomial name
- Sympycnodes epicycla (Turner, 1945)

Synonyms
- Xyleutes epicycla Turner, 1945; Endoxyla epicycla

= Sympycnodes epicycla =

Species of moth

Sympycnodes epicycla is a species of moth in the family Cossidae. It is found in Australia, where it is widely distributed in the eastern part of the continent. The habitat consists of dry to wet sclerophyll forests and woodland.

The wingspan is 29–42 mm for males and 41 mm for females. Adults have been recorded on wing from November to March.
