= Culama alpina =

Scientific classification
- Kingdom: Animalia
- Phylum: Arthropoda
- Clade: Pancrustacea
- Class: Insecta
- Order: Lepidoptera
- Family: Cossidae
- Genus: Culama
- Species: C. alpina

Binomial name
- Culama alpina Kallies & D.J. Hilton, 2012

Species of moth

Culama alpina is a moth in the family Cossidae. It was described by Kallies and D.J. Hilton in 2012. It is found in Australia, where it has been recorded from Tasmania, Victoria, New South Wales and the Australian Capital Territory. The habitat consists of alpine heath and snow gum woodlands.

The wingspan is 34–45 millimetres (1.3–1.8 in) for males and 53–55 millimetres (2.1–2.2 in) for females. Adults have been recorded on wing from December to mid-February.

The larvae possibly feed on Eucalyptus pauciflora.

== Etymology ==
The species name is derived from alpina (meaning of the alps or mountains).
