= Endoxyla biarpiti =

Scientific classification
- Kingdom: Animalia
- Phylum: Arthropoda
- Clade: Pancrustacea
- Class: Insecta
- Order: Lepidoptera
- Family: Cossidae
- Genus: Endoxyla
- Species: E. biarpiti

Binomial name
- Endoxyla biarpiti (Tindale, 1953)

Synonyms
- Xyleutes biarpiti Tindale, 1953

Species of moth

Endoxyla biarpiti is a moth in the family Cossidae. It is found in Australia, where it has been recorded from South Australia.
