= Endoxyla angasii =

Scientific classification
- Kingdom: Animalia
- Phylum: Arthropoda
- Clade: Pancrustacea
- Class: Insecta
- Order: Lepidoptera
- Family: Cossidae
- Genus: Endoxyla
- Species: E. angasii

Binomial name
- Endoxyla angasii Felder, 1874

Species of moth

Endoxyla angasii is a moth in the family Cossidae. It is found in Australia, where it has been recorded from South Australia.
