= Endoxyla bipustulata =

Scientific classification
- Kingdom: Animalia
- Phylum: Arthropoda
- Clade: Pancrustacea
- Class: Insecta
- Order: Lepidoptera
- Family: Cossidae
- Genus: Endoxyla
- Species: E. bipustulata

Binomial name
- Endoxyla bipustulata (Walker, 1865)

Synonyms
- Cossus bipustulatus Walker, 1865; Xyleutes pycnosticta Turner, 1945

Species of moth

Endoxyla bipustulata is a moth in the family Cossidae. It is found in Australia, where it has been recorded from Queensland and South Australia.
