= Endoxyla phaeocosma =

Scientific classification
- Kingdom: Animalia
- Phylum: Arthropoda
- Clade: Pancrustacea
- Class: Insecta
- Order: Lepidoptera
- Family: Cossidae
- Genus: Endoxyla
- Species: E. phaeocosma

Binomial name
- Endoxyla phaeocosma (Turner, 1911)

Synonyms
- Xyleutes phaocosma Turner, 1911

Species of moth

Endoxyla phaeocosma is a moth in the family Cossidae. It is found in Australia, where it has been recorded from Northern Australia.
