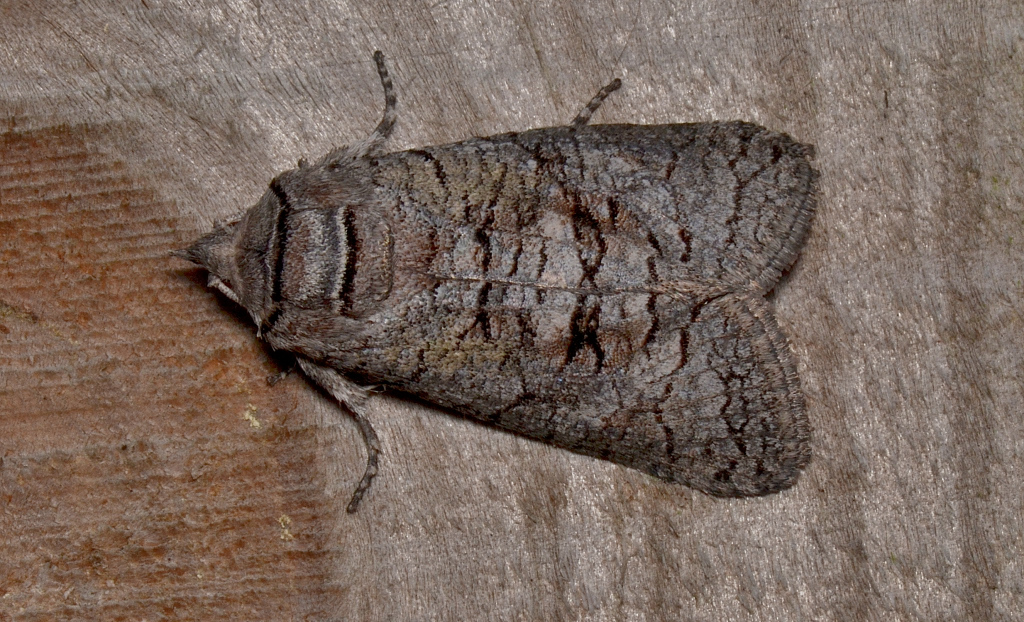

Scientific classification
- Kingdom: Animalia
- Phylum: Arthropoda
- Clade: Pancrustacea
- Class: Insecta
- Order: Lepidoptera
- Family: Cossidae
- Genus: Culama
- Species: C. suffusca

Binomial name
- Culama suffusca Kallies & D.J. Hilton, 2012

= Culama suffusca =

Species of moth

Culama suffusca is a moth in the family Cossidae. It was described by Kallies and D.J. Hilton in 2012. It is found in Australia, where it has been recorded from southern Victoria, northern New South Wales, Tasmania and the Australian Capital Territory. The habitat consists of wet sclerophyll forests.

The wingspan is 40–50 millimetres (1.6–2.0 in) for males and 55–60 millimetres (2.2–2.4 in) for females.bAdults are on wing from September to early April.
