= Endoxyla nephocosma =

Scientific classification
- Kingdom: Animalia
- Phylum: Arthropoda
- Clade: Pancrustacea
- Class: Insecta
- Order: Lepidoptera
- Family: Cossidae
- Genus: Endoxyla
- Species: E. nephocosma

Binomial name
- Endoxyla nephocosma (Turner, 1902)

Synonyms
- Xyleutes nephocosma Turner, 1902; Xyleutes molitor Rothschild, 1903; Xyleutes nephrocosma Oberthur, 1916; Xyleutes nephrocosme Dalla-Torre, 1923

Species of moth found in Australia

Endoxyla nephocosma is a moth in the family Cossidae. It is found in Australia, where it has been recorded from Queensland and Northern Australia.
