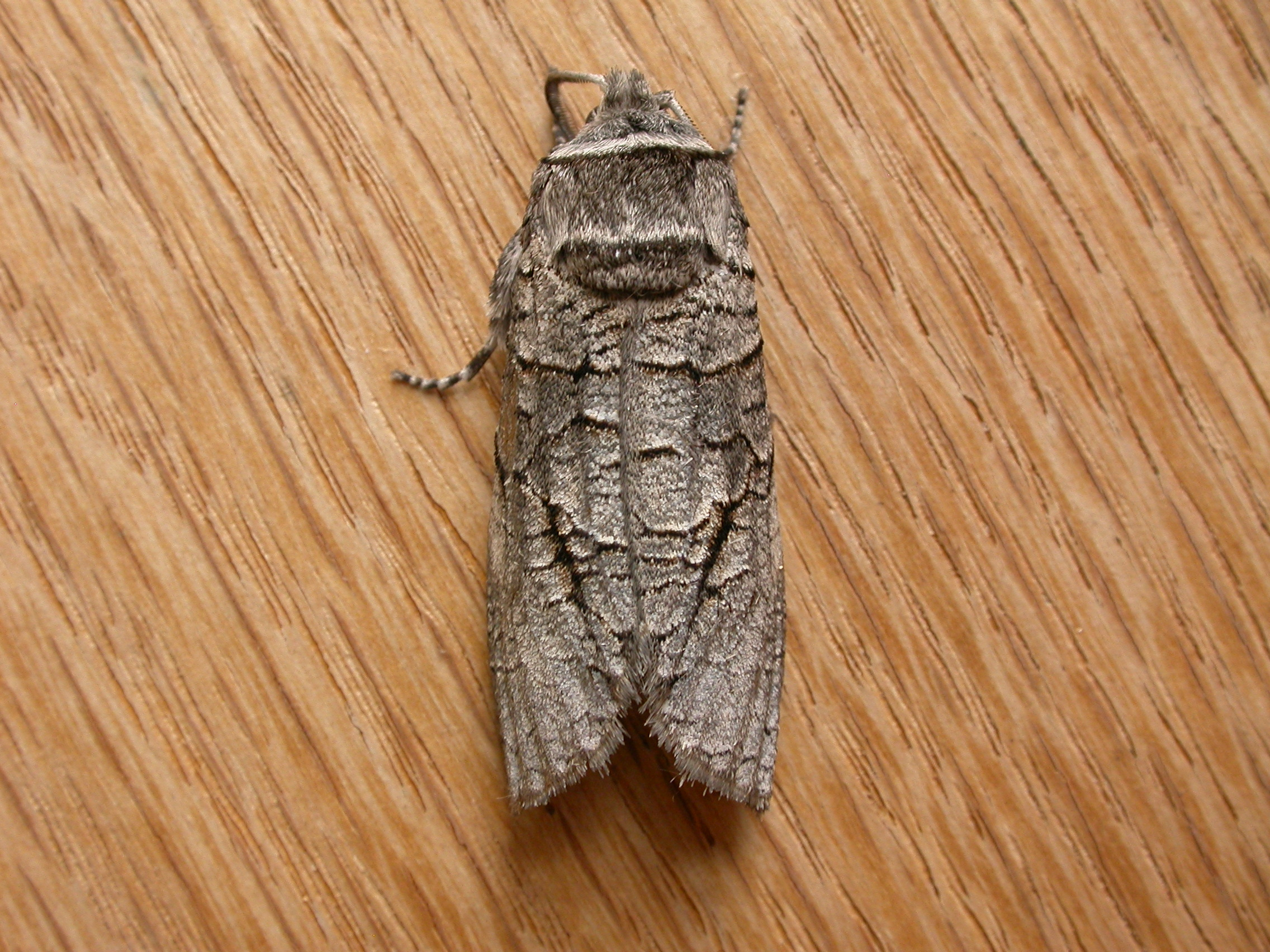

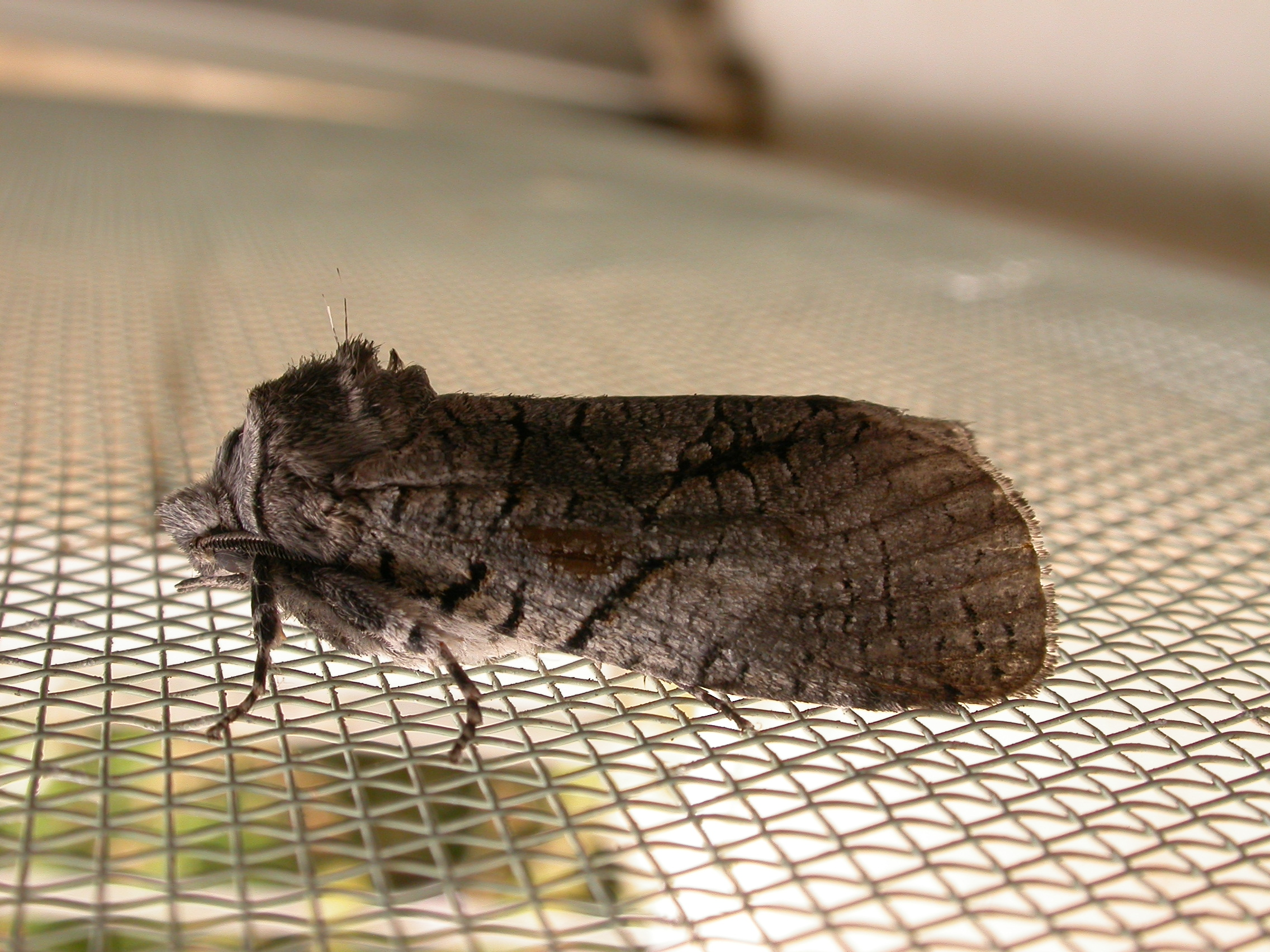

Scientific classification
- Kingdom: Animalia
- Phylum: Arthropoda
- Class: Insecta
- Order: Lepidoptera
- Family: Cossidae
- Genus: Culama
- Species: C. australis

Binomial name
- Culama australis Walker, 1856

Synonyms
- Cossus rhytiphorus Lower, 1893; Culama rhytiphorus; Culama mesogeia Turner, 1932

= Culama australis =

Species of moth

Culama australis is a moth of the family Cossidae. It is found in most of Australia, except Tasmania.

The wingspan is 51–56 mm for males and 59–66 mm for females.
