= Endoxyla lichenea =

Scientific classification
- Kingdom: Animalia
- Phylum: Arthropoda
- Clade: Pancrustacea
- Class: Insecta
- Order: Lepidoptera
- Family: Cossidae
- Genus: Endoxyla
- Species: E. lichenea

Binomial name
- Endoxyla lichenea (Rothschild, 1896)

Synonyms
- Xyleutes lichenea Rothschild, 1896; Xyleutes olbia Turner, 1915

Species of moth

Endoxyla lichenea is a moth in the family Cossidae. It is found in Australia, where it has been recorded from Queensland.
