= Skeletophyllon tempestua =

Scientific classification
- Domain: Eukaryota
- Kingdom: Animalia
- Phylum: Arthropoda
- Class: Insecta
- Order: Lepidoptera
- Family: Cossidae
- Genus: Skeletophyllon
- Species: S. tempestua

Binomial name
- Skeletophyllon tempestua (T. P. Lucas, 1898)

Synonyms
- Eudoxyla (Zeuzera) tempestua T. P. Lucas, 1898; Endoxyla tempestua

Species of moth

Skeletophyllon tempestua is a moth in the family Cossidae. It was described by Thomas Pennington Lucas in 1898. It is found in Australia, where it has been recorded from Queensland.
