= Sympycnodes interstincta =

Scientific classification
- Domain: Eukaryota
- Kingdom: Animalia
- Phylum: Arthropoda
- Class: Insecta
- Order: Lepidoptera
- Family: Cossidae
- Genus: Sympycnodes
- Species: S. interstincta

Binomial name
- Sympycnodes interstincta Kallies & D.J. Hilton, 2012

Species of moth

Sympycnodes interstincta is a species of moth of the family Cossidae. It is found in Australia, where it has been recorded from Western Australia and South Australia. The habitat consists of dry woodland and coastal woodland.

The wingspan is 35–36 mm for males and 40–43 mm for females.
