= Endoxyla vittata =

Scientific classification
- Kingdom: Animalia
- Phylum: Arthropoda
- Clade: Pancrustacea
- Class: Insecta
- Order: Lepidoptera
- Family: Cossidae
- Genus: Endoxyla
- Species: E. vittata

Binomial name
- Endoxyla vittata (Walker, 1856)

Synonyms
- Zeuzera vittata Walker, 1856; Zeuzera congerens Swinhoe, 1892

Species of moth

Endoxyla vittata, the orange-lined wood moth, is a moth in the family Cossidae. It is found in Australia, where it has been recorded from Western Australia.
