= Endoxyla tanyctena =

Scientific classification
- Kingdom: Animalia
- Phylum: Arthropoda
- Clade: Pancrustacea
- Class: Insecta
- Order: Lepidoptera
- Family: Cossidae
- Genus: Endoxyla
- Species: E. tanyctena

Binomial name
- Endoxyla tanyctena (Turner, 1945)

Synonyms
- Xyleutes tanyctena Turner, 1945

Species of moth

Endoxyla tanyctena is a moth in the family Cossidae. It is found in Australia, where it has been recorded from Queensland.
