= Archaeoses magicosema =

Scientific classification
- Kingdom: Animalia
- Phylum: Arthropoda
- Class: Insecta
- Order: Lepidoptera
- Family: Cossidae
- Genus: Archaeoses
- Species: A. magicosema

Binomial name
- Archaeoses magicosema (Meyrick, 1936)

Synonyms
- Astaropola magicosema Meyrick, 1936

Species of moth

Archaeoses magicosema is a moth in the family Dudgeoneidae. It is found in Australia, where it has been recorded from New South Wales and Victoria.
