= Orientozeuzera rhabdota =

Scientific classification
- Domain: Eukaryota
- Kingdom: Animalia
- Phylum: Arthropoda
- Class: Insecta
- Order: Lepidoptera
- Family: Cossidae
- Genus: Orientozeuzera
- Species: O. rhabdota

Binomial name
- Orientozeuzera rhabdota (Jordan, 1932)

Synonyms
- Zeuzera rhabdota Jordan, 1932; Zeuzera caudata rhabdota

Species of moth

Orientozeuzera rhabdota is a species of moth of the family Cossidae. It is found in Indonesia (Borneo, Sumatra, Java), the Philippines (Palawan), Thailand, Vietnam and Myanmar.
