= Endoxyla acontucha =

Scientific classification
- Kingdom: Animalia
- Phylum: Arthropoda
- Clade: Pancrustacea
- Class: Insecta
- Order: Lepidoptera
- Family: Cossidae
- Genus: Endoxyla
- Species: E. acontucha

Binomial name
- Endoxyla acontucha (Turner, 1903)

Synonyms
- Xyleutes acontucha Turner, 1903; Xyleutes strigus Rothschild, 1903; Endoxyla striga

Species of moth

Endoxyla acontucha is a species of moth of the family Cossidae. It is found in Australia (including Queensland) and New Zealand.
