= Endoxyla magniguttata =

Scientific classification
- Kingdom: Animalia
- Phylum: Arthropoda
- Clade: Pancrustacea
- Class: Insecta
- Order: Lepidoptera
- Family: Cossidae
- Genus: Endoxyla
- Species: E. magniguttata

Binomial name
- Endoxyla magniguttata (Gaede, 1933)

Synonyms
- Xyleutes magniguttata Gaede, 1933; Xyleutes riparia Turner, 1936

Species of moth founhd in Australia

Endoxyla magniguttata is a moth in the family Cossidae. It is found in Australia, where it has been recorded from New South Wales and Queensland.
