= Endoxyla magnifica =

Scientific classification
- Kingdom: Animalia
- Phylum: Arthropoda
- Clade: Pancrustacea
- Class: Insecta
- Order: Lepidoptera
- Family: Cossidae
- Genus: Endoxyla
- Species: E. magnifica

Binomial name
- Endoxyla magnifica (Rothschild, 1896)

Synonyms
- Xyleutes magnifica Rothschild, 1896

Species of moth found in Australia and New Zealand

Endoxyla magnifica is a moth in the family Cossidae. It is found in Australia and New Zealand.
