= Endoxyla perigypsa =

Scientific classification
- Kingdom: Animalia
- Phylum: Arthropoda
- Clade: Pancrustacea
- Class: Insecta
- Order: Lepidoptera
- Family: Cossidae
- Genus: Endoxyla
- Species: E. perigypsa

Binomial name
- Endoxyla perigypsa (Lower, 1916)

Synonyms
- Zeuzera perigypsa Lower, 1916

Species of moth

Endoxyla perigypsa is a moth in the family Cossidae. It is found in Australia, where it has been recorded from New South Wales.
