= Endoxyla polyplecta =

Scientific classification
- Kingdom: Animalia
- Phylum: Arthropoda
- Clade: Pancrustacea
- Class: Insecta
- Order: Lepidoptera
- Family: Cossidae
- Genus: Endoxyla
- Species: E. polyplecta

Binomial name
- Endoxyla polyplecta (Turner, 1932)

Synonyms
- Xyleutes polyplecta Turner, 1932

Species of moth

Endoxyla polyplecta is a moth in the family Cossidae. It is found in Australia, where it has been recorded from Northern Australia.
