= Macrocyttara pamphaea =

Scientific classification
- Kingdom: Animalia
- Phylum: Arthropoda
- Clade: Pancrustacea
- Class: Insecta
- Order: Lepidoptera
- Family: Cossidae
- Genus: Macrocyttara
- Species: M. pamphaea

Binomial name
- Macrocyttara pamphaea Turner, 1945

Synonyms
- Culama pamphaea Turner, 1945

Species of insect

Macrocyttara pamphaea is a moth in the family Cossidae. It was described by Turner in 1945. It is found in Australia, where it has been recorded from Queensland, South Australia, the Northern Territory, New South Wales and Victoria. The habitat consists of dry woodland.

The wingspan is 27.5–31 mm for males and about 41 mm for females. Adults have been recorded from September to May.
