= Endoxyla dictyoschema =

Scientific classification
- Kingdom: Animalia
- Phylum: Arthropoda
- Clade: Pancrustacea
- Class: Insecta
- Order: Lepidoptera
- Family: Cossidae
- Genus: Endoxyla
- Species: E. dictyoschema

Binomial name
- Endoxyla dictyoschema (Turner, 1915)

Synonyms
- Xyleutes dictyoschema Turner, 1915; Xyleutes dictyosoma Oberthur, 1916

Species of moth

Endoxyla dictyoschema is a moth in the family Cossidae. It is found in Australia, where it has been recorded from Queensland and Western Australia.
