= Macrocyttara expressa =

Scientific classification
- Kingdom: Animalia
- Phylum: Arthropoda
- Class: Insecta
- Order: Lepidoptera
- Family: Cossidae
- Genus: Macrocyttara
- Species: M. expressa

Binomial name
- Macrocyttara expressa (T. P. Lucas, 1902)

Synonyms
- Culama expressa T. P. Lucas, 1902

Species of moth

Macrocyttara expressa is a moth in the family Cossidae. It was described by Thomas Pennington Lucas in 1902. It is found in Australia, where it has been recorded from southern Queensland.

The wingspan is about 28–30.5 mm for males and 38.5–41.5 mm.

The larvae bore into Aegiceras corniculatum. Pupation takes place in tdhe tunnel in a cocoon covered in frass.
