= Endoxyla tigrina =

Scientific classification
- Kingdom: Animalia
- Phylum: Arthropoda
- Clade: Pancrustacea
- Class: Insecta
- Order: Lepidoptera
- Family: Cossidae
- Genus: Endoxyla
- Species: E. tigrina

Binomial name
- Endoxyla tigrina (Herrich-Schaffer, [1853])

Synonyms
- Cossus tigrinus Herrich-Schaffer, [1853]; Endoxyla tigrinus

Species of moth

Endoxyla tigrina is a moth in the family Cossidae. It is found in Australia, where it has been recorded from Queensland.
