= Endoxyla tenebrifer =

Scientific classification
- Kingdom: Animalia
- Phylum: Arthropoda
- Clade: Pancrustacea
- Class: Insecta
- Order: Lepidoptera
- Family: Cossidae
- Genus: Endoxyla
- Species: E. tenebrifer

Binomial name
- Endoxyla tenebrifer (Walker, 1865)

Synonyms
- Cossus tenebrifer Walker, 1865; Zeuzera alboatra Walker, 1865

Species of moth

Endoxyla tenebrifer is a moth in the family Cossidae. It is found in Australia, where it has been recorded from Queensland.
