= Archaeoses polygrapha =

Scientific classification
- Kingdom: Animalia
- Phylum: Arthropoda
- Class: Insecta
- Order: Lepidoptera
- Family: Cossidae
- Genus: Archaeoses
- Species: A. polygrapha

Binomial name
- Archaeoses polygrapha (Lower, 1893)

Synonyms
- Cossus polygraphus Lower, 1893; Archaeoses polygraphus

Species of moth

Archaeoses polygrapha is a moth in the family Cossidae. It is found in Australia.
