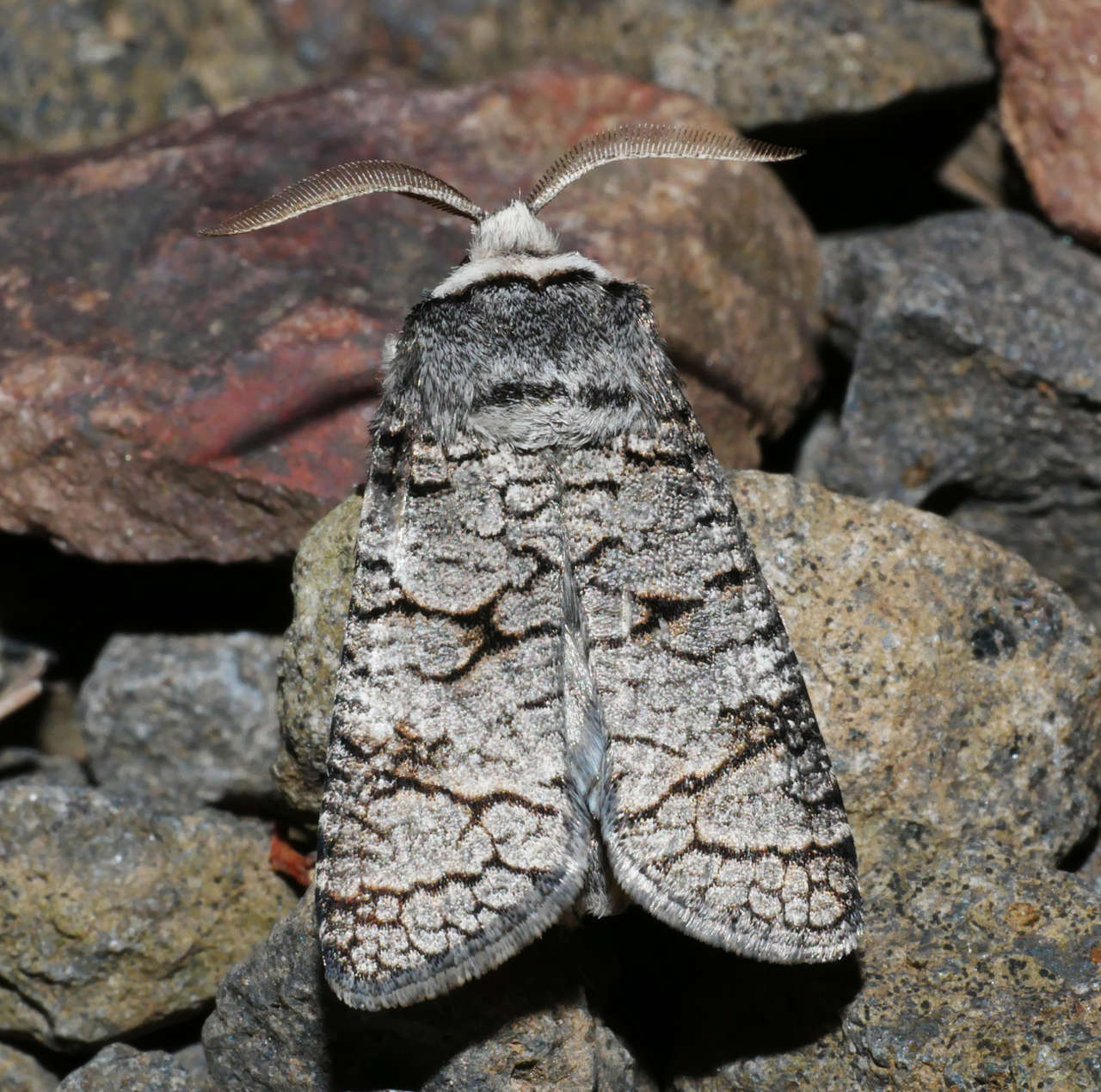

Scientific classification
- Domain: Eukaryota
- Kingdom: Animalia
- Phylum: Arthropoda
- Class: Insecta
- Order: Lepidoptera
- Family: Cossidae
- Genus: Zyganisus
- Species: Z. propedia

Binomial name
- Zyganisus propedia Kallies & D.J. Hilton, 2012

= Zyganisus propedia =

Species of moth

Zyganisus propedia is a moth in the family Cossidae. It is found in Australia, where it has been recorded from Victoria, South Australia and southern Western Australia. The habitat consists of lowland coastal forests, dry forests and heathland.

The wingspan is 44–52 mm for males and 58 mm for females. Adults are on wing from late April to mid-June.
