= Sympycnodes salterra =

Scientific classification
- Domain: Eukaryota
- Kingdom: Animalia
- Phylum: Arthropoda
- Class: Insecta
- Order: Lepidoptera
- Family: Cossidae
- Genus: Sympycnodes
- Species: S. salterra

Binomial name
- Sympycnodes salterra Kallies & D.J. Hilton, 2012

Species of moth

Sympycnodes salterra is a species of moth of the family Cossidae. It is found in Australia, where it has been recorded from northern New South Wales, Queensland and Western Australia. The habitat consists of dry woodland.

The wingspan is 27–38 mm for males and 37 mm for females. Adults have been recorded from August to February.
