= Endoxyla interlucens =

Scientific classification
- Kingdom: Animalia
- Phylum: Arthropoda
- Clade: Pancrustacea
- Class: Insecta
- Order: Lepidoptera
- Family: Cossidae
- Genus: Endoxyla
- Species: E. interlucens

Binomial name
- Endoxyla interlucens (Lucas, 1898)

Synonyms
- Eudoxyla (Zeuzera) interlucens Lucas, 1898; Xyleutes platyphaea Turner, 1945

Species of moth

Endoxyla interlucens is a moth in the family Cossidae. It is found in Australia, where it has been recorded from Queensland.
