= Endoxyla columbina =

Scientific classification
- Kingdom: Animalia
- Phylum: Arthropoda
- Clade: Pancrustacea
- Class: Insecta
- Order: Lepidoptera
- Family: Cossidae
- Genus: Endoxyla
- Species: E. columbina

Binomial name
- Endoxyla columbina Lucas, 1898

Synonyms
- Eudoxyla (Zeuzera) columbina Lucas, 1898; Xyleutes turneriana Oberthur, 1916

Species of moth

Endoxyla columbina is a moth in the family Cossidae. It is found in Australia, where it has been recorded from Queensland and New South Wales.
