= Endoxyla donovani =

Scientific classification
- Kingdom: Animalia
- Phylum: Arthropoda
- Clade: Pancrustacea
- Class: Insecta
- Order: Lepidoptera
- Family: Cossidae
- Genus: Endoxyla
- Species: E. donovani

Binomial name
- Endoxyla donovani (Rothschild, 1897)

Synonyms
- Xyleutes donovani Rothschild, 1897; Trismelasmos donovani; Eudoxyla (Zeuzera) cretosa Lucas, 1898; Endoxyla cretosa

Species of moth

Endoxyla donovani is a moth in the family Cossidae. It is found in Australia, where it has been recorded from Queensland, New South Wales and Victoria.
