= Culama anthracica =

Scientific classification
- Kingdom: Animalia
- Phylum: Arthropoda
- Clade: Pancrustacea
- Class: Insecta
- Order: Lepidoptera
- Family: Cossidae
- Genus: Culama
- Species: C. anthracica

Binomial name
- Culama anthracica Kallies & D.J. Hilton, 2012

Species of moth

Culama anthracica is a moth in the family Cossidae. It was described by Kallies and D.J. Hilton in 2012. It is found in Australia, where it has been recorded along the eastern coast and tablelands from Tasmania west and north to southern Victoria and southern Queensland. The habitat consists of wet and dry sclerophyll forests and montane woodlands.

The wingspan is 45–52 millimetres (1.8–2.0 in) for males and 54–57 millimetres (2.1–2.2 in) for females. Adults are on wing from the end of October to early March.
