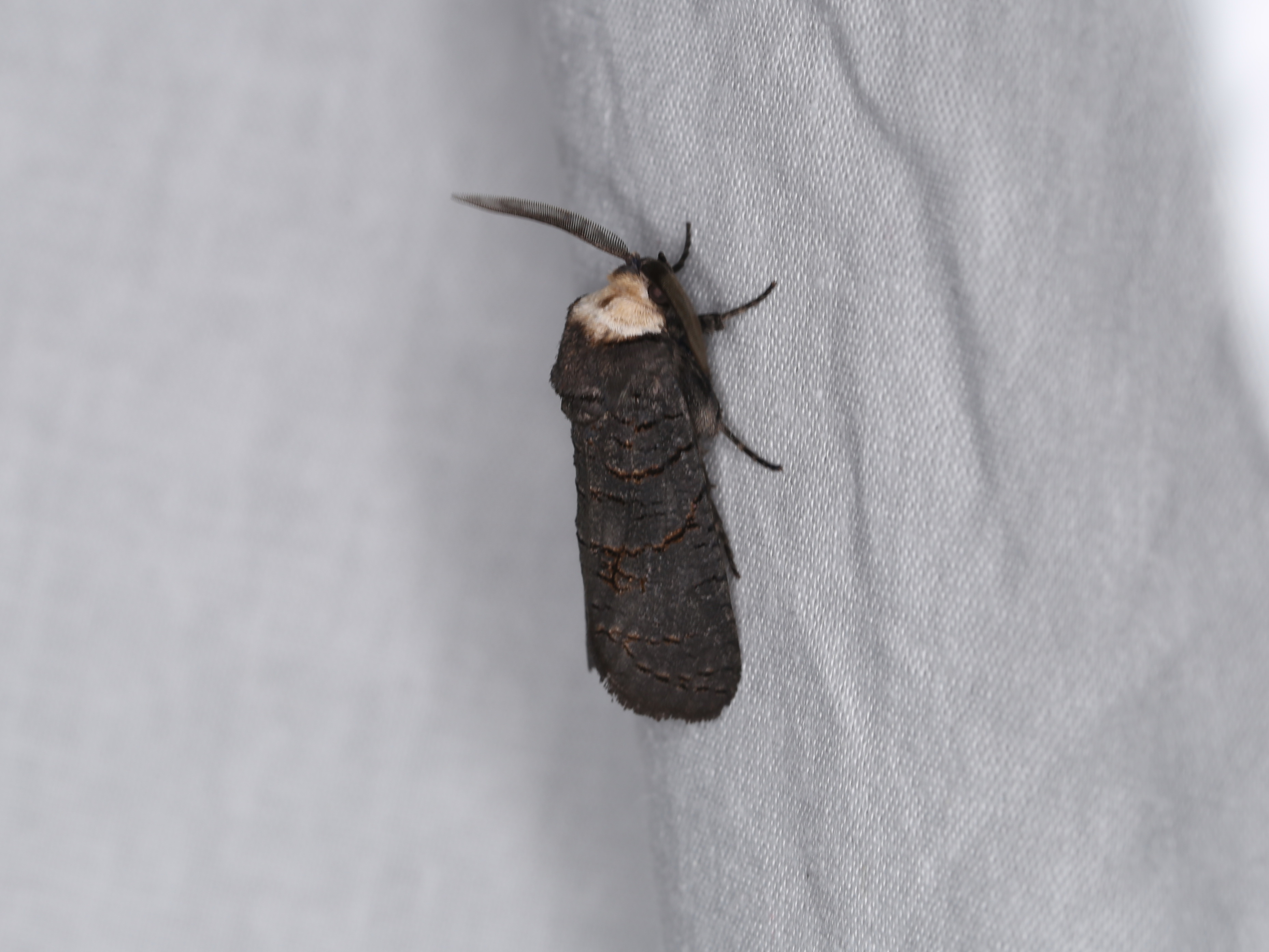

Scientific classification
- Domain: Eukaryota
- Kingdom: Animalia
- Phylum: Arthropoda
- Class: Insecta
- Order: Lepidoptera
- Family: Cossidae
- Genus: Culama
- Species: C. crepera

Binomial name
- Culama crepera Turner, 1939

= Culama crepera =

Species of moth

Culama crepera is a moth in the family Cossidae. It was described by Turner in 1939. It is found in Australia, where it has been recorded from southern Western Australia, through South Australia to western-central Victoria and New South Wales.

The wingspan is 39–44 mm for males and 48 mm for females. Adults have been recorded on wing from September to early April.
