= Endoxyla opposita =

Scientific classification
- Kingdom: Animalia
- Phylum: Arthropoda
- Clade: Pancrustacea
- Class: Insecta
- Order: Lepidoptera
- Family: Cossidae
- Genus: Endoxyla
- Species: E. opposita

Binomial name
- Endoxyla opposita (Walker, 1865)

Synonyms
- Zeuzera opposita Walker, 1865; Eudoxyla collumellaris Lucas, 1898; Eudoxyla irretita Lucas, 1898; Xyleutes irretilus Houlbert, 1916; Xyleutes irratila Dalla-Torre, 1923

Species of moth

Endoxyla opposita is a moth in the family Cossidae. It is found in Australia, where it has been recorded from Queensland, Victoria and New South Wales.
