= Endoxyla decorata =

Scientific classification
- Kingdom: Animalia
- Phylum: Arthropoda
- Clade: Pancrustacea
- Class: Insecta
- Order: Lepidoptera
- Family: Cossidae
- Genus: Endoxyla
- Species: E. decorata

Binomial name
- Endoxyla decorata (C. Swinhoe, 1892)

Synonyms
- Strigoides decoratus C. Swinhoe, 1892

Species of moth

Endoxyla decorata is a moth in the family Cossidae first described by Charles Swinhoe in 1892. It is found in Australia, where it has been recorded from Western Australia.
