= Orientozeuzera aeglospila =

Scientific classification
- Domain: Eukaryota
- Kingdom: Animalia
- Phylum: Arthropoda
- Class: Insecta
- Order: Lepidoptera
- Family: Cossidae
- Genus: Orientozeuzera
- Species: O. aeglospila

Binomial name
- Orientozeuzera aeglospila (Turner, 1915)

Synonyms
- Zeuzera aeglospila Turner, 1915; Zeuzera aglospila Dalla-Torre, 1923

Species of moth

Orientozeuzera aeglospila is a moth in the family Cossidae. It was described by Turner in 1915. It is found in Australia, where it has been recorded from Queensland.
