= Endoxyla macleayi =

Scientific classification
- Kingdom: Animalia
- Phylum: Arthropoda
- Clade: Pancrustacea
- Class: Insecta
- Order: Lepidoptera
- Family: Cossidae
- Genus: Endoxyla
- Species: E. macleayi

Binomial name
- Endoxyla macleayi Frogatt, 1894

Synonyms
- Xyleutes maculatus Rothschild, 1899; Xyleutes rothschildi Oberthur, 1916; Xyleutes rothschildi Dalla-Torre, 1923

Species of moth

Endoxyla macleayi is a moth in the family Cossidae. It is found in Australia, where it has been recorded from New South Wales and southern Queensland.

The larvae have been recorded feeding on Eucalyptus species.
