= Endoxyla eluta =

Scientific classification
- Kingdom: Animalia
- Phylum: Arthropoda
- Clade: Pancrustacea
- Class: Insecta
- Order: Lepidoptera
- Family: Cossidae
- Genus: Endoxyla
- Species: E. eluta

Binomial name
- Endoxyla eluta (Rothschild, 1903)

Synonyms
- Xyleutes eluta Rothschild, 1903

Species of moth

Endoxyla eluta is a species of moth of the family Cossidae. It is found in Australia, where it has been recorded from Queensland.
