= Sympycnodes rhaptodes =

Scientific classification
- Domain: Eukaryota
- Kingdom: Animalia
- Phylum: Arthropoda
- Class: Insecta
- Order: Lepidoptera
- Family: Cossidae
- Genus: Sympycnodes
- Species: S. rhaptodes

Binomial name
- Sympycnodes rhaptodes Turner, 1942

Species of moth

Sympycnodes rhaptodes is a species of moth of the family Cossidae. It is found in Australia, where it has been recorded from Victoria to Queensland and possibly the Northern Territory. It is found in a wide range of habitats, including subalpine areas, as well as wet and dry sclerophyll forests.

The wingspan is 24–41 mm for males and 37–54 mm for females. Adults have been recorded on wing from November to March.
