= Endoxyla eremonoma =

Scientific classification
- Kingdom: Animalia
- Phylum: Arthropoda
- Clade: Pancrustacea
- Class: Insecta
- Order: Lepidoptera
- Family: Cossidae
- Genus: Endoxyla
- Species: E. eremonoma

Binomial name
- Endoxyla eremonoma (Turner, 1906)

Synonyms
- Xyleutes eremonoma Turner, 1906

Species of moth

Endoxyla eremonoma is a moth in the family Cossidae. It is found in Australia, where it has been recorded from Queensland.
