= Endoxyla secta =

Scientific classification
- Kingdom: Animalia
- Phylum: Arthropoda
- Clade: Pancrustacea
- Class: Insecta
- Order: Lepidoptera
- Family: Cossidae
- Genus: Endoxyla
- Species: E. secta

Binomial name
- Endoxyla secta Lucas, 1898

Synonyms
- Eudoxyla (Zeuzera) secta Lucas, 1898; Xyleutes diaplecta Turner, 1945; Endoxyla diaplecta

Species of moth

Endoxyla secta is a moth in the family Cossidae. It is found in Australia, where it has been recorded from Queensland, South Australia and Western Australia.
