= Sympycnodes digitata =

Scientific classification
- Domain: Eukaryota
- Kingdom: Animalia
- Phylum: Arthropoda
- Class: Insecta
- Order: Lepidoptera
- Family: Cossidae
- Genus: Sympycnodes
- Species: S. digitata

Binomial name
- Sympycnodes digitata Kallies & D.J. Hilton, 2012

Species of moth

Sympycnodes digitata is a species of moth of the family Cossidae. It is found in Australia, where it has been recorded along the eastern coast and tablelands from the Queensland to Victoria. The habitat consists of wet sclerophyll forests.

The wingspan is 18–38 mm for males and 34–51 mm for females.
