= Sympycnodes arachnophora =

Scientific classification
- Domain: Eukaryota
- Kingdom: Animalia
- Phylum: Arthropoda
- Class: Insecta
- Order: Lepidoptera
- Family: Cossidae
- Genus: Sympycnodes
- Species: S. arachnophora

Binomial name
- Sympycnodes arachnophora (Turner, 1945)

Synonyms
- Xyleutes arachnophora Turner, 1945; Zeuzera arachnophora; Endoxyla arachnophora

Species of moth

Sympycnodes arachnophora is a species of moth of the family Cossidae. It is found in Australia, where it is only found in inland south-eastern Australia. The habitat consists of dry woodland.

The wingspan is 35–41 mm for males and 44 mm for females. Adults have been recorded on wing from December to March.
