= Sympycnodes dunnorum =

Scientific classification
- Domain: Eukaryota
- Kingdom: Animalia
- Phylum: Arthropoda
- Class: Insecta
- Order: Lepidoptera
- Family: Cossidae
- Genus: Sympycnodes
- Species: S. dunnorum

Binomial name
- Sympycnodes dunnorum Kallies & D.J. Hilton, 2012

Species of moth

Sympycnodes dunnorum is a species of moth of the family Cossidae. It is found in Australia, where it has been recorded from Western Australia, through South Australia to Victoria, the Australian Capital Territory, New South Wales and Queensland. The habitat consists of coastal woodland and dry forests.

The wingspan is 21–45 mm for males and 34–48 mm for females. Adults have been recorded on wing from late November to early February.

== Etymology ==
The species is named in honour of Professor Ashley and Mrs Jean Dunn.
