= Endoxyla eumitra =

Scientific classification
- Kingdom: Animalia
- Phylum: Arthropoda
- Clade: Pancrustacea
- Class: Insecta
- Order: Lepidoptera
- Family: Cossidae
- Genus: Endoxyla
- Species: E. eumitra

Binomial name
- Endoxyla eumitra (Turner, 1926)

Synonyms
- Zeuzera eumitra Turner, 1926

Species of moth

Endoxyla eumitra is a moth in the family Cossidae. It is found in Australia, where it has been recorded from Queensland.
