= Zyganisus acalanthis =

Scientific classification
- Domain: Eukaryota
- Kingdom: Animalia
- Phylum: Arthropoda
- Class: Insecta
- Order: Lepidoptera
- Family: Cossidae
- Genus: Zyganisus
- Species: Z. acalanthis

Binomial name
- Zyganisus acalanthis Kallies & D.J. Hilton, 2012

Species of moth

Zyganisus acalanthis is a moth in the family Cossidae. It is found in Australia, where it has been recorded from southern Western Australia.

The wingspan is 42–44 mm for males.
