= Culama glauca =

Scientific classification
- Kingdom: Animalia
- Phylum: Arthropoda
- Clade: Pancrustacea
- Class: Insecta
- Order: Lepidoptera
- Family: Cossidae
- Genus: Culama
- Species: C. glauca

Binomial name
- Culama glauca Kallies & D.J. Hilton, 2012

Species of moth

Culama glauca is a moth in the family Cossidae. It was described by Kallies and D.J. Hilton in 2012. It is found in Australia, where it has been recorded from Western Australia and New South Wales. The habitat consists of dry woodlands, mallee and heath.

The wingspan is 37–48 millimetres (1.5–1.9 in) for males and 43–52 millimetres (1.7–2.0 in) for females.

The larvae possibly feed on Eucalyptus populnea and Eucalyptus camaldulensis.
