= Endoxyla duponchelli =

Scientific classification
- Kingdom: Animalia
- Phylum: Arthropoda
- Clade: Pancrustacea
- Class: Insecta
- Order: Lepidoptera
- Family: Cossidae
- Genus: Endoxyla
- Species: E. duponchelli

Binomial name
- Endoxyla duponchelli (Newman, 1856)

Synonyms
- Zeuzera duponchelii Newman, 1856; Dictyocossus duponcheli Houlbert, 1916

Species of moth

Endoxyla duponchelli is a moth in the family Cossidae. It is found in Australia, where it has been recorded from Queensland and the Northwest Territories.
