= Endoxyla coscinopa =

Scientific classification
- Kingdom: Animalia
- Phylum: Arthropoda
- Clade: Pancrustacea
- Class: Insecta
- Order: Lepidoptera
- Family: Cossidae
- Genus: Endoxyla
- Species: E. coscinopa

Binomial name
- Endoxyla coscinopa (Lower, 1901)

Synonyms
- Zeuzera coscinopa Lower, 1901

Species of moth

Endoxyla coscinopa is a moth in the family Cossidae. It is found in Australia, where it has been recorded from Western Australia.
