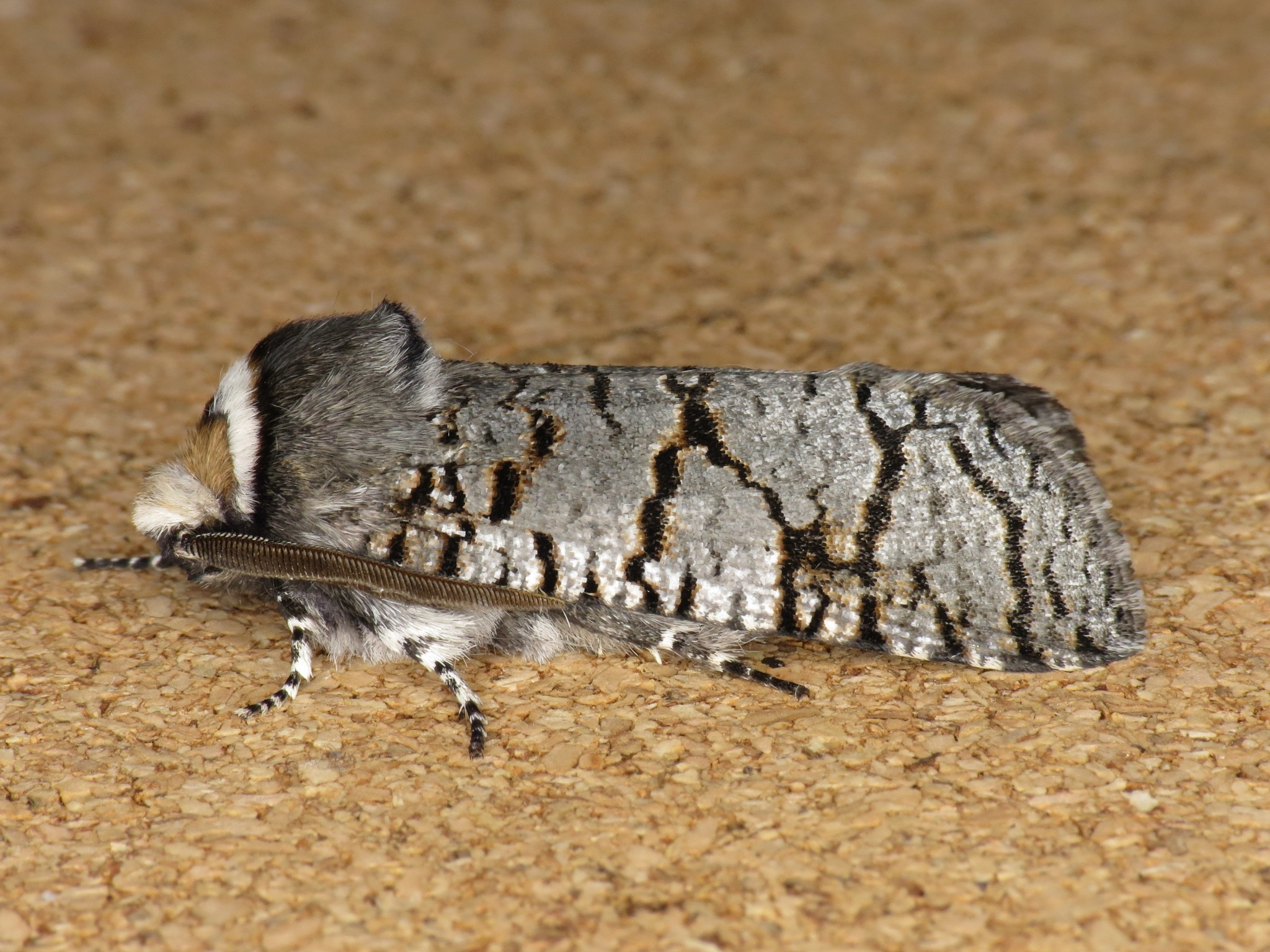

Scientific classification
- Domain: Eukaryota
- Kingdom: Animalia
- Phylum: Arthropoda
- Class: Insecta
- Order: Lepidoptera
- Family: Cossidae
- Genus: Zyganisus
- Species: Z. fulvicollis

Binomial name
- Zyganisus fulvicollis (Gaede, 1933)

Synonyms
- Pseudocossus fulvicollis Gaede, 1933

= Zyganisus fulvicollis =

Species of moth

Zyganisus fulvicollis is a moth in the family Cossidae. It is found in south-eastern Australia, where it can be found from Tasmania and Victoria to the Australian Capital Territory and New South Wales.

The wingspan is 52–59 mm for males and 67–72 mm for females. Adults are on wing from mid-May to the end of August.
