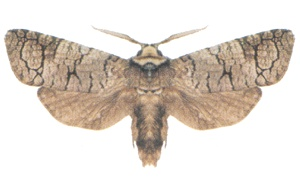

Scientific classification
- Kingdom: Animalia
- Phylum: Arthropoda
- Class: Insecta
- Order: Lepidoptera
- Family: Cossidae
- Genus: Zyganisus
- Species: Z. caliginosus

Binomial name
- Zyganisus caliginosus (Walker, 1856)

Synonyms
- Cossus caliginosus Walker, 1856; Culama caliginosa; Cossus rubiginosa Gallard, 1915

= Zyganisus caliginosus =

Species of moth

Zyganisus caliginosus, the Australian goat moth, is a moth of the family Cossidae. It is found in Tasmania, Victoria and New South Wales.
