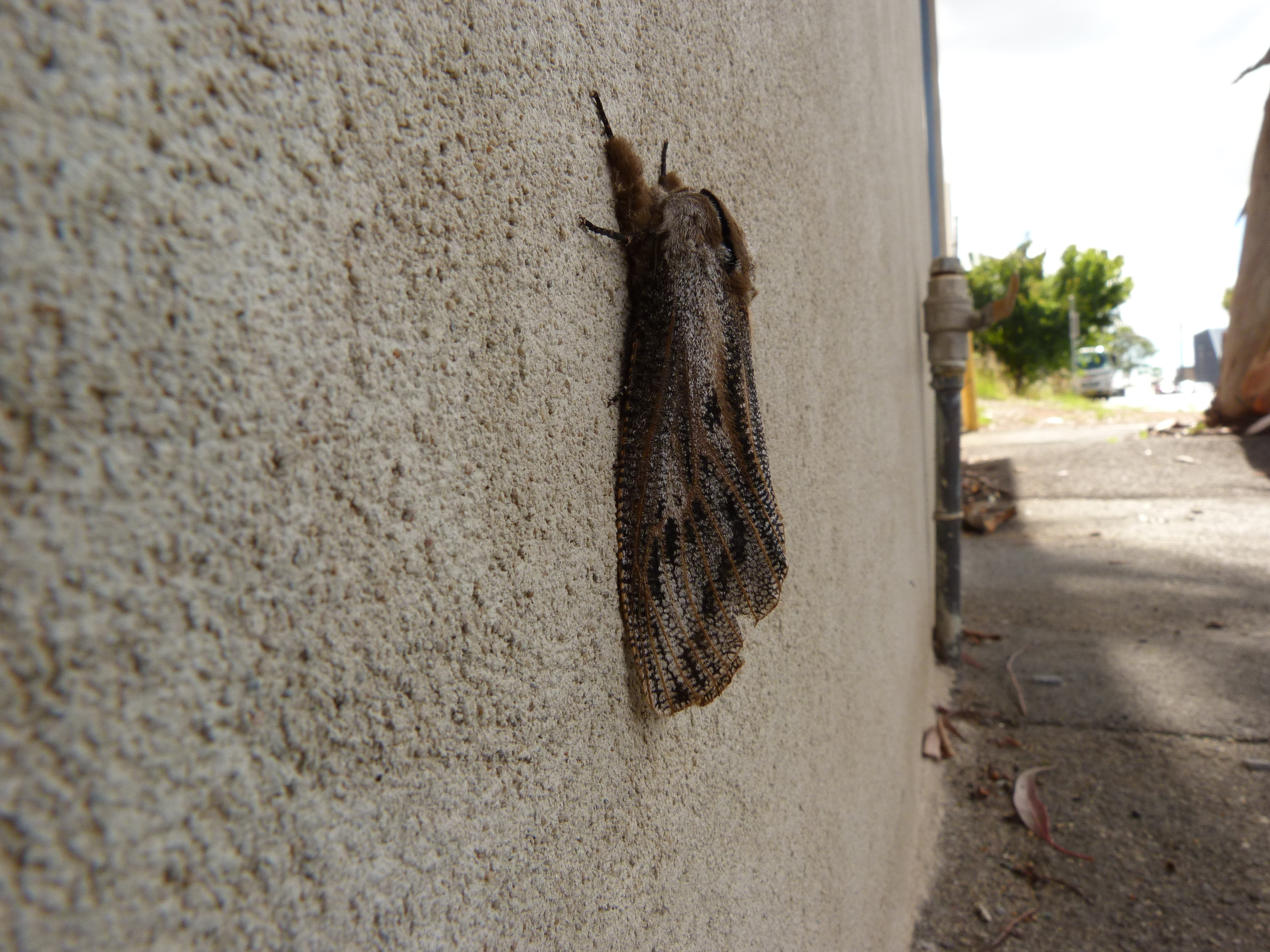

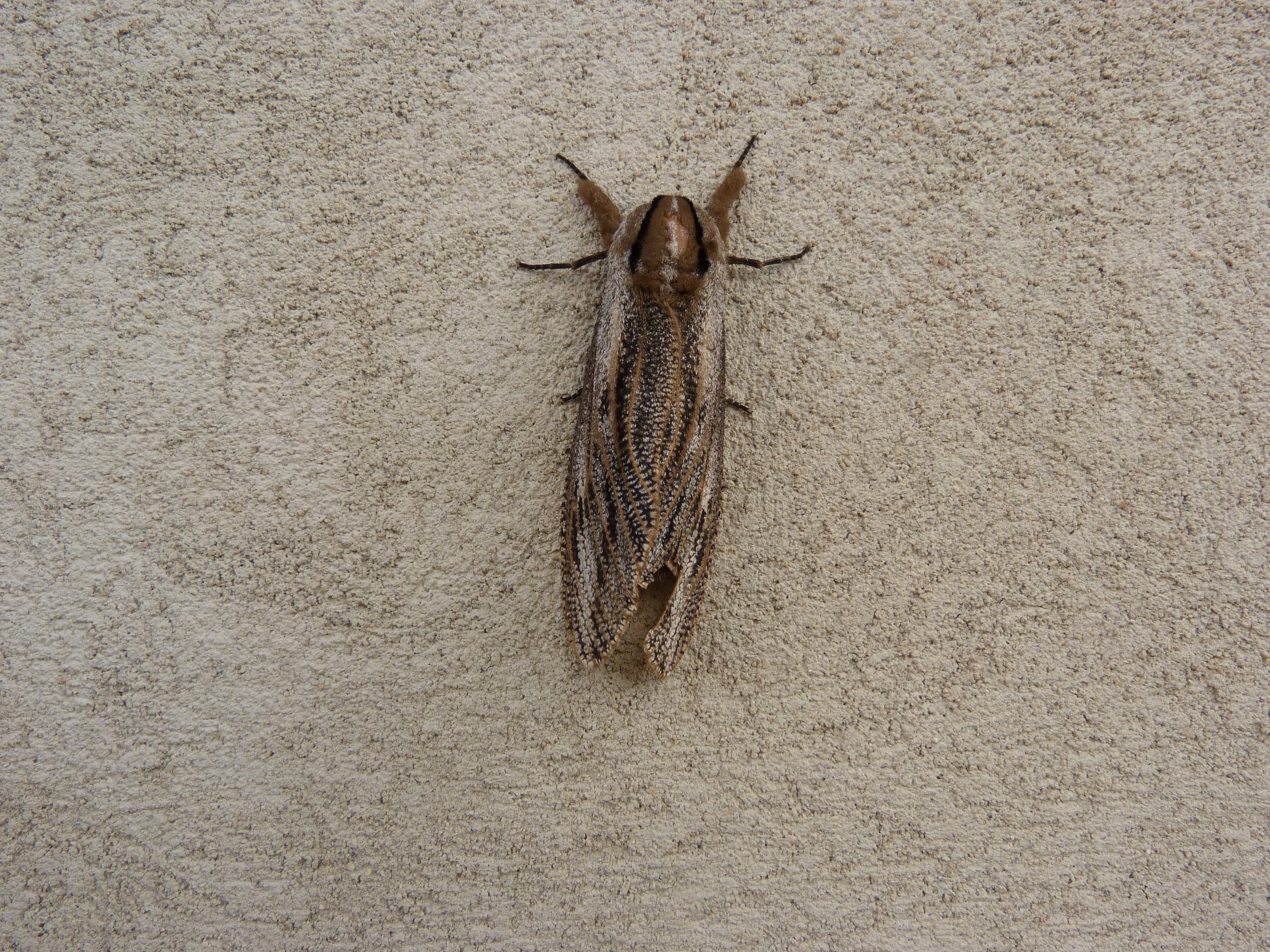

Scientific classification
- Kingdom: Animalia
- Phylum: Arthropoda
- Clade: Pancrustacea
- Class: Insecta
- Order: Lepidoptera
- Family: Cossidae
- Genus: Endoxyla
- Species: E. lituratus

Binomial name
- Endoxyla lituratus (Donovan, 1805)

Synonyms
- Cossus lituratus Donovan, 1805; Xyrena casuarinae Herrich-Schäffer, 1854; Xyrena camarinae Walker, 1856; Xyrena camarina Walker, 1856; Eudoxyla insulana T.P. Lucas, 1898; Dictyocossus striata Houlbert, 1916

= Endoxyla lituratus =

Species of moth

Endoxyla lituratus is a moth of the family Cossidae. It is found throughout Australia.

The wingspan is about 70 mm.
