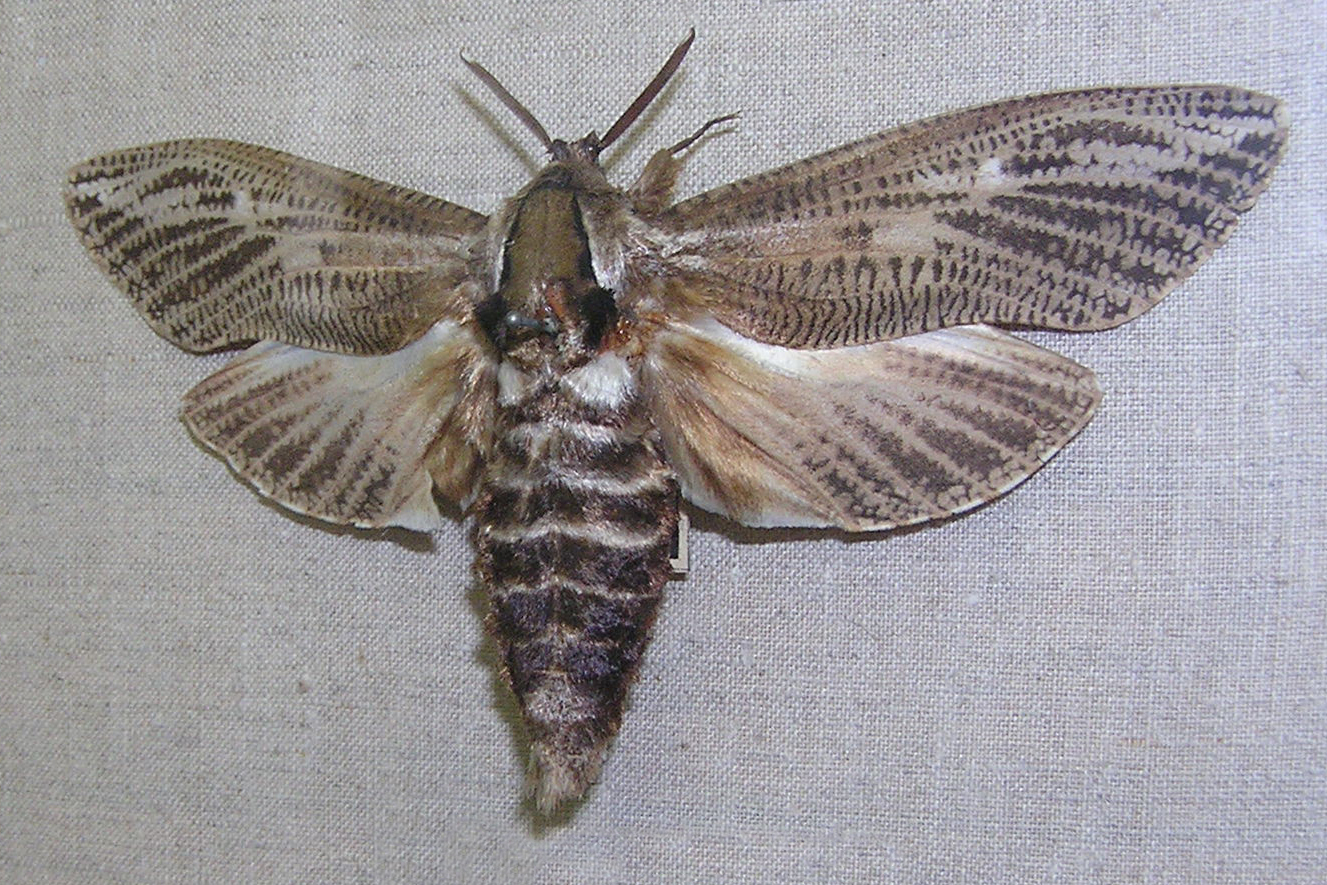

Scientific classification
- Kingdom: Animalia
- Phylum: Arthropoda
- Clade: Pancrustacea
- Class: Insecta
- Order: Lepidoptera
- Family: Cossidae
- Genus: Endoxyla
- Species: E. encalypti

Binomial name
- Endoxyla encalypti Herrich-Schäffer, [1854]

Synonyms
- Xyleutes encalypti; Endoxyla durvilli Herrich-Schäffer, 1854; Xyleutes d'urvillei; Endoxyla eucalypti Herrich-Schaffer, [1854]; Zeuzera eucalypti Walker, 1856; Xyleutes urvillii Newman, 1856; Xyleutes durvillii Oberthur, 1916; Xyleutes durvillei Turner, 1945

= Endoxyla encalypti =

Species of moth

Endoxyla encalypti, the wattle goat moth, is a large moth of the family Cossidae. It is found in Australia, where it has been recorded along the eastern coast from Queensland through New South Wales and Victoria to Tasmania. It bores into the trunks of various wattle species as a larva, pupating in the ground before emerging as an adult.
