= List of moths of Australia (Epipyropidae) =

Partial list of Australian moths

This is a list of the Australian moth species of the family Epipyropidae. It also acts as an index to the species articles and forms part of the full List of moths of Australia.

- Agamopsyche threnodes Perkins, 1905
- Heteropsyche micromorpha Perkins, 1905
- Heteropsyche poecilochroma Perkins, 1905
- Heteropsyche stenomorpha Perkins, 1905
- Palaeopsyche melanias Perkins, 1905
