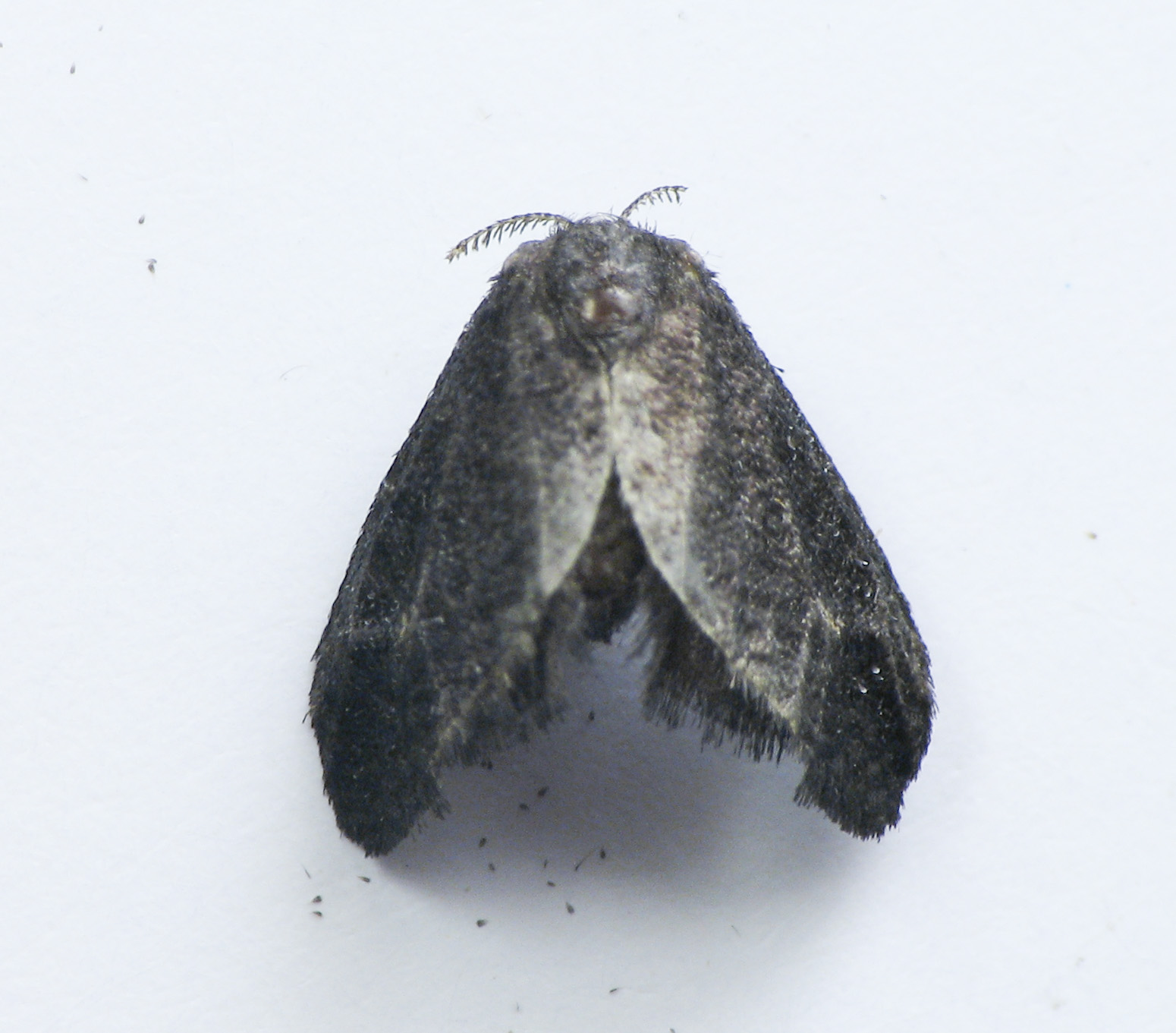
- Fulgoraecia exigua or Epipyrops exigua. Female

Scientific classification
- Domain: Eukaryota
- Kingdom: Animalia
- Phylum: Arthropoda
- Class: Insecta
- Order: Lepidoptera
- Family: Epipyropidae
- Genus: Epipyrops; Bowring, 1852

Type species
- Epipyrops anomala Bowring, 1852

Synonyms
- Fulgoraecia Newman, 1851; Pseudopsyche H. Edwards, 1882 (preocc. Oberthür, 1880); Oedonia Kirby, 1892; Microlimax Hampson, 1896

= Epipyrops =

Genus of moths

Epipyrops is a genus of moths in the family Epipyropidae. Also known as Fulgoraecia.

== Species ==
- Epipyrops atra (Pagenstecher, 1900)
- Epipyrops bowringi (Newman, 1851)
- Epipyrops cerolestes Tams, 1947
- Epipyrops cucullata (Heinrich, 1931)
- Epipyrops epityraea Scheven, 1974
- Epipyrops exigua (H. Edwards, 1882)
- Epipyrops fuliginosa (Tams, 1922)
- Epipyrops fulvipunctata Distant, 1913
- Epipyrops grandidieri Viette, 1961
- Epipyrops malagassica Jordan, 1928
- Epipyrops pallidipuncta (Hampson, 1896)
- Epipyrops poliographa Hampson, 1910
- Epipyrops radama Viette, 1961

== Former species ==
- Epipyrops anomala Bowring, 1852
- Epipyrops eurybrachydis T. B. Fletcher, 1920
- Epipyrops melanoleuca T. B. Fletcher, 1939
- Epipyrops schawerdae Zerny 1929
