= Epipyrops poligrapha =

Scientific classification
- Domain: Eukaryota
- Kingdom: Animalia
- Phylum: Arthropoda
- Class: Insecta
- Order: Lepidoptera
- Family: Epipyropidae
- Genus: Epipyrops
- Species: E. poligrapha

Binomial name
- Epipyrops poligrapha (Hampson, 1910)

Synonyms
- Fulgoraecia poliographa Krampl & Dlabola, 1983

Species of moth

Epipyrops poligrapha is a species of moth of the family Epipyropidae. It is known for its parasitic bond with its host, the coffee bee hawkmoth. The host is killed by the larvae of the female moth, which lays its eggs on its body and feeds on its hemolymph. The moth is in most common in Australia and Southeast Asia.

The moth has transparent wings and a colorful body, its biology and appearance have drawn attention from scientists.

An illustration of parasitism in nature is the relationship between Epipyrops poligrapha and the coffee bee hawkmoth, in which one organism benefits at the expense of another.
