= Epipyrops pallidipuncta =

Scientific classification
- Kingdom: Animalia
- Phylum: Arthropoda
- Class: Insecta
- Order: Lepidoptera
- Family: Epipyropidae
- Genus: Epipyrops
- Species: E. pallidipuncta

Binomial name
- Epipyrops pallidipuncta (Hampson, 1896)

Synonyms
- Microlimax pallidipuncta Hampson, 1896; Fulgoraecia pallidipuncta

Species of moth

Epipyrops pallidipuncta is a moth in the family Epipyropidae. It was described by George Hampson in 1896. It is found in Sri Lanka.
