= Epipyrops fuliginosa =

Scientific classification
- Domain: Eukaryota
- Kingdom: Animalia
- Phylum: Arthropoda
- Class: Insecta
- Order: Lepidoptera
- Family: Epipyropidae
- Genus: Epipyrops
- Species: E. fuliginosa

Binomial name
- Epipyrops fuliginosa (Tams, 1922)

Synonyms
- Fulgoraecia fuliginosa

Species of moth

Epipyrops fuliginosa is a moth in the family Epipyropidae. It was described by Willie Horace Thomas Tams in 1922. It is found in India.
