= Protacraga micans =

Scientific classification
- Kingdom: Animalia
- Phylum: Arthropoda
- Class: Insecta
- Order: Lepidoptera
- Family: Epipyropidae
- Genus: Protacraga
- Species: P. micans

Binomial name
- Protacraga micans Hopp, 1924

Synonyms
- Dalcera nigerella Dognin, 1920; Protacraga nigerella

Species of moth

Protacraga micans is a moth in the family Epipyropidae. It was described by Walter Hopp in 1924. It is found in Brazil.
