= Epipyrops bowringi =

Scientific classification
- Kingdom: Animalia
- Phylum: Arthropoda
- Clade: Pancrustacea
- Class: Insecta
- Order: Lepidoptera
- Family: Epipyropidae
- Genus: Epipyrops
- Species: E. bowringi

Binomial name
- Epipyrops bowringi (Newman, 1851)

Synonyms
- Fulgoraecia bowringi Newman, 1851; Epipyrops anomala Westwood, 1876; Fulgoraecia bowringii Newman, 1851

Species of moth

Epipyrops bowringi is a moth in the Epipyropidae family. It was described by Newman in 1851. It is found in China and India.
