= Epipyrops grandidieri =

Scientific classification
- Kingdom: Animalia
- Phylum: Arthropoda
- Class: Insecta
- Order: Lepidoptera
- Family: Epipyropidae
- Genus: Epipyrops
- Species: E. grandidieri

Binomial name
- Epipyrops grandidieri Viette, 1961

Synonyms
- Fulgoraecia grandidieri

Species of moth

Epipyrops grandidieri is a moth in the Epipyropidae family. It was described by Viette in 1961. It is found in Madagascar.
