= Epimesophantia =

Scientific classification
- Kingdom: Animalia
- Phylum: Arthropoda
- Class: Insecta
- Order: Lepidoptera
- Family: Epipyropidae
- Genus: Epimesophantia; Krampl in Krampl & Dlabola, 1983

Genus of moths

Epimesophantia is a genus of moths belonging to the Epipyropidae family.

== Species ==
- Epimesophantia dlabolai Krampl, 1983

== Former species ==
- Epimesophantia schawerdae (Zerny, 1929)
