= Epipyrops poliographa =

Scientific classification
- Kingdom: Animalia
- Phylum: Arthropoda
- Class: Insecta
- Order: Lepidoptera
- Family: Epipyropidae
- Genus: Epipyrops
- Species: E. poliographa

Binomial name
- Epipyrops poliographa Hampson, 1910

Synonyms
- Fulgoraecia poliographa

Species of moth

Epipyrops poliographa is a moth in the family Epipyropidae. It was described by George Hampson in 1910. It is found in Sri Lanka.
