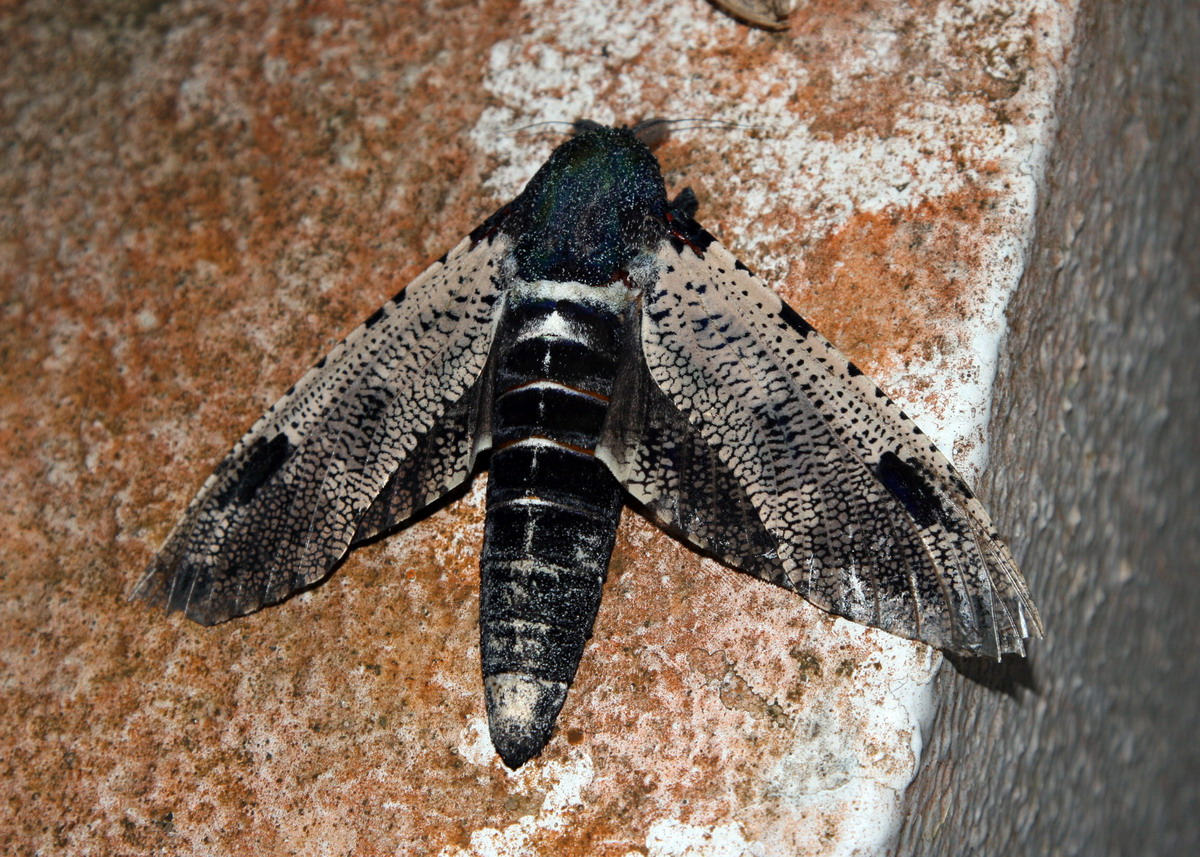
- Xyleutes strix

Scientific classification
- Kingdom: Animalia
- Phylum: Arthropoda
- Clade: Pancrustacea
- Class: Insecta
- Order: Lepidoptera
- Family: Cossidae
- Subfamily: Zeuzerinae
- Genus: Xyleutes; Hübner, [1820]

Type species
- Phalaena strix Linnaeus, 1758

Species
- See text

Synonyms
- Hinnaeya Moore, 1883; Melanostrigus Houlbert, 1916; Strigomorphus Houlbert, 1916; Strigoides Guérin-Méneville, 1844; Hyleutes Gaede, 1915; Kyleutes Clench, 1959

= Xyleutes =

Genus of moths

Xyleutes is a genus of moths belonging to the family Cossidae and typical of the tribe Xyleutini.

Many species of Xyleutes are considered as crop or forestry pests. They are stem borers boring the branches and trunks of coffee, teak, eucalyptus, acacia and other forest trees.

== Species ==
A current list for Xyleutes may include:

1. Xyleutes altitudinis Viette, 1958
2. Xyleutes angasii Felder, 1874
3. Xyleutes armstrongi Hampson, 1914
4. Xyleutes atrosparsellus Walker, 1863
5. Xyleutes auroguttata Herrich-Schäffer, 1854
6. Xyleutes benestriata (Hampson, 1904) (Bahamas)
7. Xyleutes bimaculata Box, 1931
8. Xyleutes bipustulata Walker, 1865
9. Xyleutes borneana Roepke, 1957
10. Xyleutes boschae Heylaerts, 1892
11. Xyleutes castaneus Kenrick, 1913
12. Xyleutes castrellus Schaus, 1922
13. Xyleutes casuarinae Herrich-Schäffer, 1855
14. Xyleutes celebensis Roepke, 1957
15. Xyleutes celebesa Walker, 1865
16. Xyleutes columbina Lucas, 1898
17. Xyleutes columellaris Lucas, 1898
18. Xyleutes combustus Kenrick, 1913
19. Xyleutes cretacea Butler, 1878
20. Xyleutes cretosa Lucas, 1898
21. Xyleutes decorata Swinhoe, 1892
22. Xyleutes desdemona Dyar & Schaus, 1937 (Brasil)
23. Xyleutes dorsipunctellus Schaus, 1922
24. Xyleutes duponchelli Newman, 1856
25. Xyleutes endothermalis Hampson, 1919
26. Xyleutes eucalypti Herrich-Schäffer, 1855
27. Xyleutes fusca Swinhoe, 1892
28. Xyleutes fuscipars Hampson, 1892
29. Xyleutes heinrichi Box, 1931
30. Xyleutes incanellus Hampson, 1895
31. Xyleutes inclusa Walker, 1856
32. Xyleutes insulana Lucas, 1898
33. Xyleutes interlucens Lucas, 1898
34. Xyleutes jamaicensis Schaus, 1901
35. Xyleutes keyensis Strand, 1919 (Maluku Islands)
36. Xyleutes lanceolatus Zeller, 1881
37. Xyleutes lecerfi Viette, 1958
38. Xyleutes leucolophus Guérin-Meneville, 1829
39. Xyleutes lillianae Lindsey, 1926
40. Xyleutes liturata Donovan, 1805
41. Xyleutes minutiscripta Lucas, 1898
42. Xyleutes murina Herrich-Schäffer, 1858
43. Xyleutes nebulosa Donovan, 1805
44. Xyleutes nigra Moore, 1877
45. Xyleutes nigristigmellus Hampson, 1895
46. Xyleutes occultoides Kenrick, 1913
47. Xyleutes opposita Walker, 1865
48. Xyleutes paleacea Herrich-Schäffer, 1858
49. Xyleutes pardalis Dudgeon, 1899
50. Xyleutes persona (Le Guillou, 1841) (India, Sri Lanka, South-east Asia to the Solomons, Australia)
51. Xyleutes peruanellus Schaus, 1922
52. Xyleutes pindarus Fawcett, 1916
53. Xyleutes poam (Dyar, 1918) (Mexico)
54. Xyleutes punctifera Hampson, 1898
55. Xyleutes punctifimbria Walker, 1865
56. Xyleutes pustulata Herrich-Schäffer, 1858
57. Xyleutes ramamurthyi Yakovlev & Sankararaman, 2021
58. Xyleutes secta Lucas, 1898
59. Xyleutes simillima Hampson, 1916
60. Xyleutes spectabilis Felder, 1875
61. Xyleutes squamata Hampson, 1919
62. Xyleutes squameus Distant, 1902
63. Xyleutes steniptera Hampson, 1916
64. Xyleutes striata (Druce, 1901) (Colombia)
65. Xyleutes strix (Linnaeus, 1758) (from India, South-east Asia including the Philippines to New Guinea)
66. Xyleutes tectorius Swinhoe, 1901
67. Xyleutes tempestua Lucas, 1898
68. Xyleutes tenebrifera Walker, 1865
69. Xyleutes terrafirma Schaus, 1911 (Costa Rica)
70. Xyleutes tristis Gaede, 1915
71. Xyleutes unilinea Dyar, 1925 (Mexico)
72. Xyleutes vinasella Schaus, 1913
73. Xyleutes xanthotherma Hampson, 1919 (Peru)
74. Xyleutes xuna Dyar, 1937 (Mexico)
75. Xyleutes zeuzeroides Walker, 1865

=== Species placed elsewhere ===
Previously this was a large genus, with more than 135 species included in some databases, but many of these may now are placed in the genera:

- Aethalopteryx
- Bergaris
- Brypoctia
- Chalcidica
- Duomitus
- Endoxyla (prev. Luzoniella)
- Epipomponia
- Eulophonotus
- Givira
- Hermophyllon
- Morpheis
- Myelobia
- Panau
- Phragmataecia
- Pseudozeuzera
- Psychonoctua
- Rapdalus
- Roerichiora
- Skeletophyllon
- Somatoxena
- Strigocossus
- Trismelasmos
