= Epipyrops cucullata =

Scientific classification
- Domain: Eukaryota
- Kingdom: Animalia
- Phylum: Arthropoda
- Class: Insecta
- Order: Lepidoptera
- Family: Epipyropidae
- Genus: Epipyrops
- Species: E. cucullata

Binomial name
- Epipyrops cucullata (Heinrich, 1931)

Synonyms
- Fulgoraecia cucullata

Species of moth

Epipyrops cucullata is a moth in the family Epipyropidae. It was described by Carl Heinrich in 1931. It is found on Haiti.

The wingspan is about 10 mm. Adults are blackish fuscous. The forewings and hindwings are concolorous and the head and thorax are somewhat darker.
