= Epipyrops cerolestes =

Scientific classification
- Kingdom: Animalia
- Phylum: Arthropoda
- Class: Insecta
- Order: Lepidoptera
- Family: Epipyropidae
- Genus: Epipyrops
- Species: E. cerolestes

Binomial name
- Epipyrops cerolestes (Tams, 1947)

Synonyms
- Fulgoraecia cerolestes Tams, 1947

Species of moth

Epipyrops cerolestes is a moth in the family Epipyropidae. It was described by Willie Horace Thomas Tams in 1947. It is found in Tanzania.
