= Ommatissopyrops lusitanicus =

Scientific classification
- Kingdom: Animalia
- Phylum: Arthropoda
- Class: Insecta
- Order: Lepidoptera
- Family: Epipyropidae
- Genus: Ommatissopyrops
- Species: O. lusitanicus

Binomial name
- Ommatissopyrops lusitanicus Bivar de Sousa & Quartau, 1998

Species of moth

Ommatissopyrops lusitanicus is a moth in the family Epipyropidae. It was described by António Bivar de Sousa and José Alberto Quartau in 1998. It is found in Spain and Portugal.

The larvae are ectoparasites of Ommatissus binotatus.
