= Epipyrops atra =

Scientific classification
- Kingdom: Animalia
- Phylum: Arthropoda
- Class: Insecta
- Order: Lepidoptera
- Family: Epipyropidae
- Genus: Epipyrops
- Species: E. atra

Binomial name
- Epipyrops atra (Pagenstecher, 1900)

Synonyms
- Orgyia atra Pagenstecher, 1900; Fulgoraecia atra

Species of moth

Epipyrops atra is a moth in the Epipyropidae family. It was described by Pagenstecher in 1900. It is found on the Bismarck Islands.
