= Epipomponia multipunctata =

Scientific classification
- Domain: Eukaryota
- Kingdom: Animalia
- Phylum: Arthropoda
- Class: Insecta
- Order: Lepidoptera
- Family: Epipyropidae
- Genus: Epipomponia
- Species: E. multipunctata

Binomial name
- Epipomponia multipunctata (H. Druce, 1887)

Synonyms
- Cossus multipunctata H. Druce, 1887; Xyleutes multipunctata H. Druce, 1887

Species of moth

Epipomponia multipunctata is a moth in the family Epipyropidae first described by Herbert Druce in 1887. It is found in Panama.
