= Epipyrops epityraea =

Scientific classification
- Kingdom: Animalia
- Phylum: Arthropoda
- Class: Insecta
- Order: Lepidoptera
- Family: Epipyropidae
- Genus: Epipyrops
- Species: E. epityraea

Binomial name
- Epipyrops epityraea (Scheven, 1974)

Synonyms
- Fulgoraecia epityraea Scheven, 1974

Species of moth

Epipyrops epityraea is a moth in the Epipyropidae family. It was described by Scheven in 1974. It is found in Tanzania.

The larvae live in coccid colonies of the species Ityraea patricia, found on the liana Hippocratea africana.
