= Epipomponia elongata =

Scientific classification
- Domain: Eukaryota
- Kingdom: Animalia
- Phylum: Arthropoda
- Class: Insecta
- Order: Lepidoptera
- Family: Epipyropidae
- Genus: Epipomponia
- Species: E. elongata

Binomial name
- Epipomponia elongata Jordan, 1928

Species of moth

Epipomponia elongata is a moth in the family Epipyropidae. It was described by Karl Jordan in 1928. It is found in South America.
