= Epipyrops malagassica =

Scientific classification
- Kingdom: Animalia
- Phylum: Arthropoda
- Clade: Pancrustacea
- Class: Insecta
- Order: Lepidoptera
- Family: Epipyropidae
- Genus: Epipyrops
- Species: E. malagassica

Binomial name
- Epipyrops malagassica Jordan, 1928

Synonyms
- Fulgoraecia malagassica

Species of moth

Epipyrops malagassica is a moth in the family Epipyropidae. It was described by Karl Jordan in 1928. It is found on Madagascar.
