= Epipyrops fulvipunctata =

Scientific classification
- Kingdom: Animalia
- Phylum: Arthropoda
- Class: Insecta
- Order: Lepidoptera
- Family: Epipyropidae
- Genus: Epipyrops
- Species: E. fulvipunctata

Binomial name
- Epipyrops fulvipunctata Distant, 1913

Synonyms
- Fulgoraecia fulvipunctata; Epipyrops fulvipuncta Janse, 1917

Species of moth

Epipyrops fulvipunctata is a moth in the family Epipyropidae. It was described by William Lucas Distant in 1913. It is found in South Africa, where it has been recorded from KwaZulu-Natal.

The larvae have been recorded feeding on the coccid species Rhinortha guttata.
