= Xyleutes xanthotherma =

Scientific classification
- Kingdom: Animalia
- Phylum: Arthropoda
- Class: Insecta
- Order: Lepidoptera
- Family: Cossidae
- Subfamily: Zeuzerinae
- Genus: Xyleutes
- Species: X. xanthotherma

Binomial name
- Xyleutes xanthotherma (Hampson, 1919)

Synonyms
- Doratoperas xanthotherma Hampson, 1919; Myelobia xanthoterma Bleszynski & Collins, 1962

Species of moth

Xyleutes xanthotherma is a moth in the family Cossidae described by George Hampson in 1919. It is found in Peru.
