= Xyleutes unilinea =

Scientific classification
- Domain: Eukaryota
- Kingdom: Animalia
- Phylum: Arthropoda
- Class: Insecta
- Order: Lepidoptera
- Family: Cossidae
- Genus: Xyleutes
- Species: X. unilinea

Binomial name
- Xyleutes unilinea (Dyar, 1925)

Synonyms
- Psychonoctua unilinea Dyar, 1925

Species of moth

Xyleutes unilinea is a moth in the family Cossidae. It was described by Harrison Gray Dyar Jr. in 1925 and is found in Mexico.
