= Xyleutes striata =

Scientific classification
- Domain: Eukaryota
- Kingdom: Animalia
- Phylum: Arthropoda
- Class: Insecta
- Order: Lepidoptera
- Family: Cossidae
- Genus: Xyleutes
- Species: X. striata

Binomial name
- Xyleutes striata (Druce, 1901)

Synonyms
- Duomitus striata Druce, 1901

Species of moth

Xyleutes striata is a moth in the family Cossidae. It is found in Colombia.
