= Xyleutes keyensis =

Scientific classification
- Domain: Eukaryota
- Kingdom: Animalia
- Phylum: Arthropoda
- Class: Insecta
- Order: Lepidoptera
- Family: Cossidae
- Genus: Xyleutes
- Species: X. keyensis

Binomial name
- Xyleutes keyensis Strand, 1919

Species of moth

Xyleutes keyensis is a moth in the family Cossidae. It is found on the Kei Islands and Tanimbar Islands.
