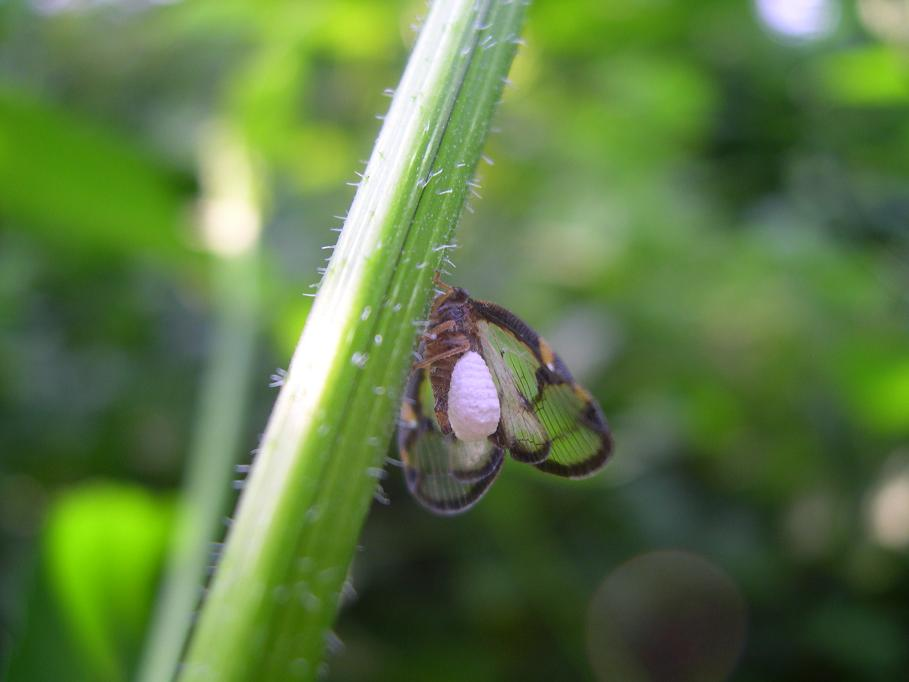
- white caterpillar of E. hagoromo attached to leafhopper host

Scientific classification
- Domain: Eukaryota
- Kingdom: Animalia
- Phylum: Arthropoda
- Class: Insecta
- Order: Lepidoptera
- Family: Epipyropidae
- Genus: Epiricania
- Species: E. hagoromo

Binomial name
- Epiricania hagoromo Katô, 1939

= Epiricania hagoromo =

Species of moth

Epiricania hagoromo is a moth in the Epipyropidae family. It was described by Katô in 1939. It is found in Japan.
