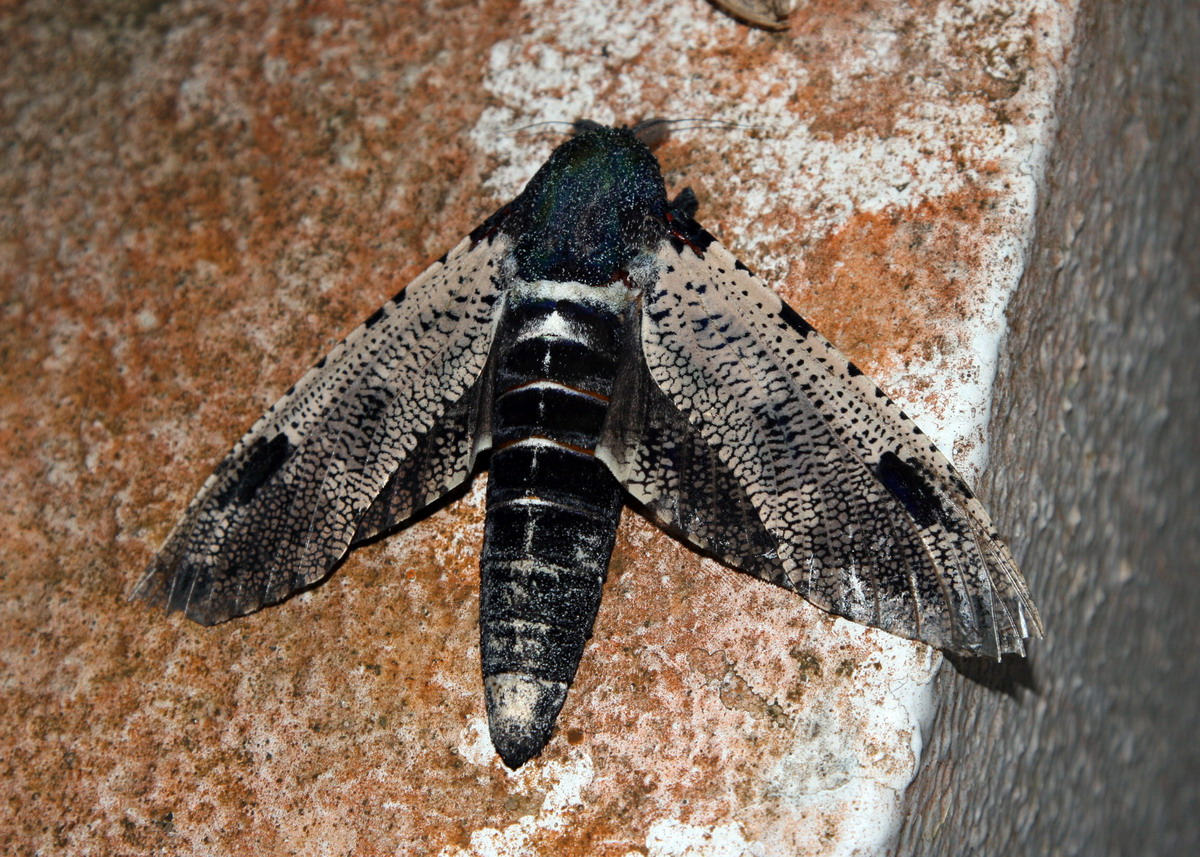

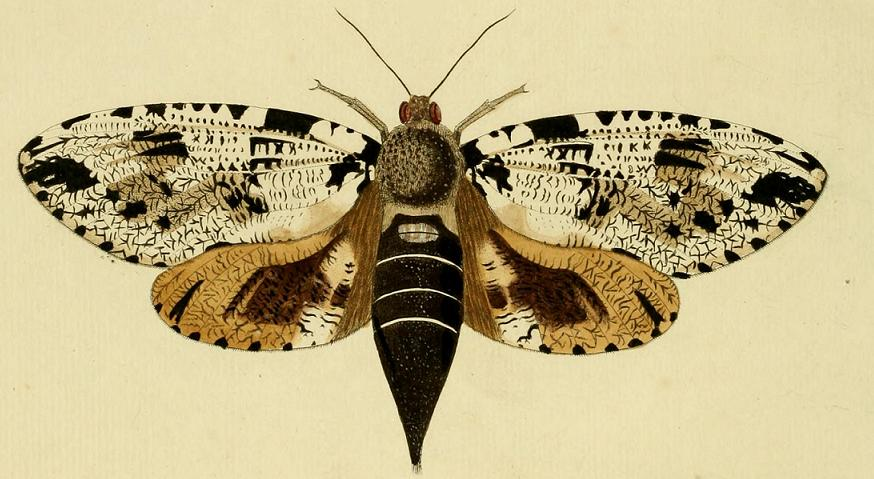

Scientific classification
- Kingdom: Animalia
- Phylum: Arthropoda
- Class: Insecta
- Order: Lepidoptera
- Family: Cossidae
- Subfamily: Zeuzerinae
- Genus: Xyleutes
- Species: X. strix

Binomial name
- Xyleutes strix (Linnaeus, 1758)

Synonyms
- Phalaena (Noctua) strix Linnaeus, 1758; Zeuzera signata Walker, 1856; Zeuzera bubo Butler, 1882; Xyrena tigrata Houlbert, 1916; Xyleutes stryx var. formosicola Strand, 1915

= Xyleutes strix =

Species of moth

Xyleutes strix is a moth of the family Cossidae. It is found in India, Indochina, Malesia: "Sundaland", the Philippines, Sulawesi, the Moluccas and New Guinea.
