= Epiricania melanoleuca =

Scientific classification
- Domain: Eukaryota
- Kingdom: Animalia
- Phylum: Arthropoda
- Class: Insecta
- Order: Lepidoptera
- Family: Epipyropidae
- Genus: Epiricania
- Species: E. melanoleuca

Binomial name
- Epiricania melanoleuca (T. B. Fletcher, 1939)

Synonyms
- Epipyrops melanoleuca T. B. Fletcher, 1939; Fulgoraecia melanoleuca (Fletcher)

Species of moth

Epiricania melanoleuca is a moth in the family Epipyropidae. It was described by Thomas Bainbrigge Fletcher in 1939. It is found in India, where its larvae are external parasitoids of the sugarcane planthopper (Pyrilla perpusilla). It has been used in biological pest control against this pest.

== Description ==
The adult E. melanoleuca is a small, dark grey, moth with short, broad wings giving it a triangular outline. The male has a whitish margin to both pairs of wings, while the female has slatey-grey forewings and dark grey hindwings. The wingspan is 10 to 13 mm (0.4 to 0.5 in) in females, and slightly less in males. The antennae are bipectinate (have comb-like lateral processes on both sides). The larvae are at first campodeiform, having a long flattened body, legs and antennae, but the later instars are fleshy and ellipsoidal; they are concealed by the white waxy filaments they secrete. The pupa is concealed in an oval, white, silken cocoon.

== Distribution ==
Epiricania melanoleuca is native to India, occurring in the drier parts of the sugarcane-growing area. It also occurs in Pakistan and Bangladesh, and has been introduced into Sri Lanka.

== Ecology ==
The larvae of E. melanoleuca are parasitoids on the sugarcane planthopper (Pyrilla perpusilla). The moth's eggs are laid on the surface of the leaves on which the planthopper and its nymphs are feeding. Fecundity of the female moth is in the range 400 to 800. On hatching, the moth larvae attach themselves with their prolegs to the edge of a leaf and hold themselves erect, questing for a suitable host. When one is found, they attach themselves to the planthopper nymph with hooked claws, pierce the cuticle with their mouthparts and suck out the hemolymph. When the moth larvae are fully grown, after four or five moults, they can be seen as conspicuous, white bulges on the surface of the host. They then detach from their hosts, which dies at around this time, and pupate on the surface of a leaf near the ground.

== Use in biological control ==
Epiricania melanoleuca can be used in biological pest control. When it has been introduced to areas of India where it does not naturally occur, the incidence of the sugarcane planthopper has been reduced. The moth can be bred in the laboratory, and eggs can be transferred on leaves, or cocoons can be collected from fields and transferred. In a research study in Orissa, peak planthopper activity was observed in September. A parasite/pest ratio of 1:64 in late August was converted into a ratio of 1:0.25 in late October, indicating control of the pest. As well as the natural suppression of the pest, there is a considerable saving to be made by reducing the use of insecticides on the sugarcane crop.
