= Heteropsyche =

Scientific classification
- Kingdom: Animalia
- Phylum: Arthropoda
- Class: Insecta
- Order: Lepidoptera
- Family: Epipyropidae
- Genus: Heteropsyche; Perkins, 1905

Genus of moths

Heteropsyche is a genus of moths in the Epipyropidae family.

== Species ==
- Heteropsyche micromorpha Perkins, 1905
- Heteropsyche poecilochroma Perkins, 1905
- Heteropsyche stenomorpha Perkins, 1905
