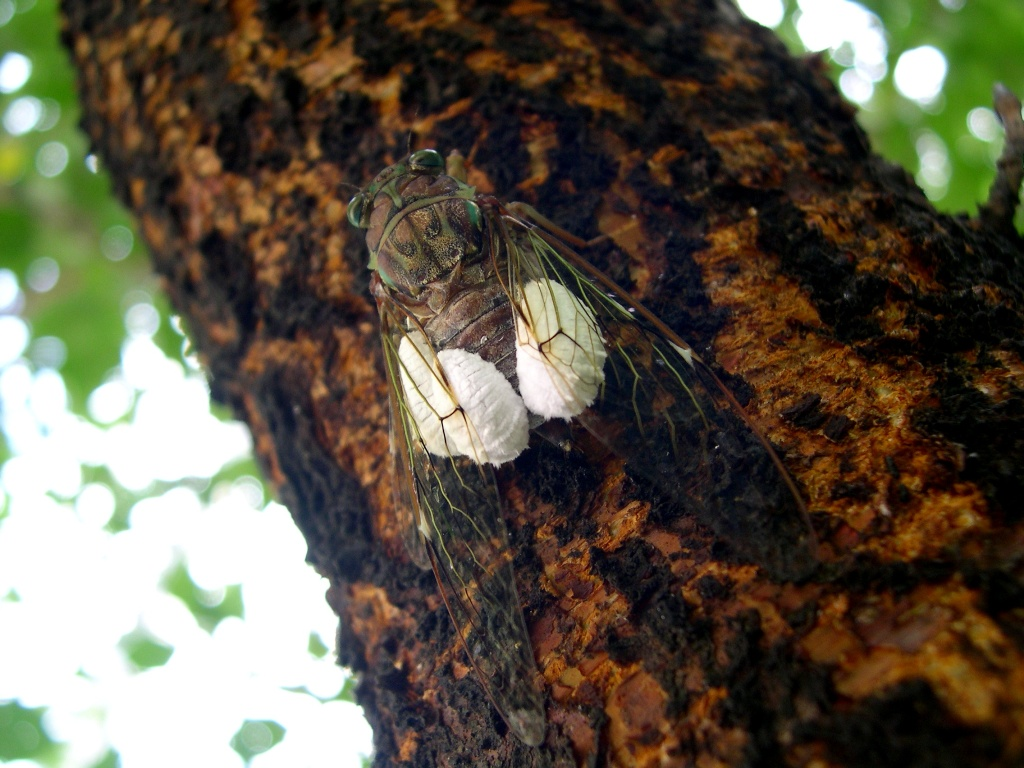

Scientific classification
- Kingdom: Animalia
- Phylum: Arthropoda
- Class: Insecta
- Order: Lepidoptera
- Family: Epipyropidae
- Genus: Epipomponia
- Species: E. nawai

Binomial name
- Epipomponia nawai (Dyar, 1904)

Synonyms
- Epypyros nawai Dyar, 1904

= Epipomponia nawai =

Species of moth

Epipomponia nawai is a moth in the Epipyropidae family. It was described by Harrison Gray Dyar Jr. in 1904. It is found in Japan, Taiwan, China, and Korea.

The wingspan is about 22 mm. The wings are entirely black, the forewings with many bluish-metallic scales. As a caterpillar, E. nawai is an ectoparasite of cicadas such as Hyalessa maculaticollis and Meimuna opalifera species.

== Life cycle ==
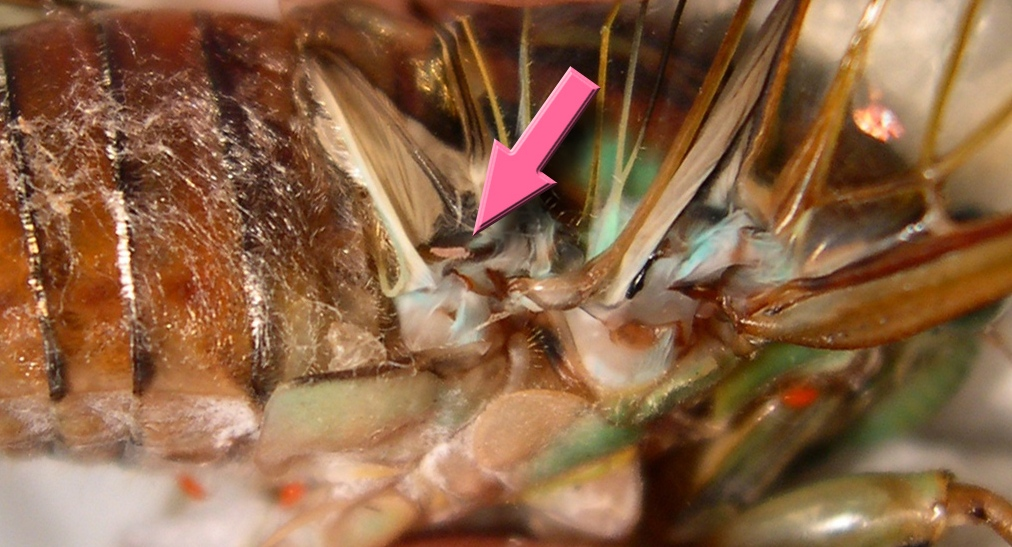
1st instar larva

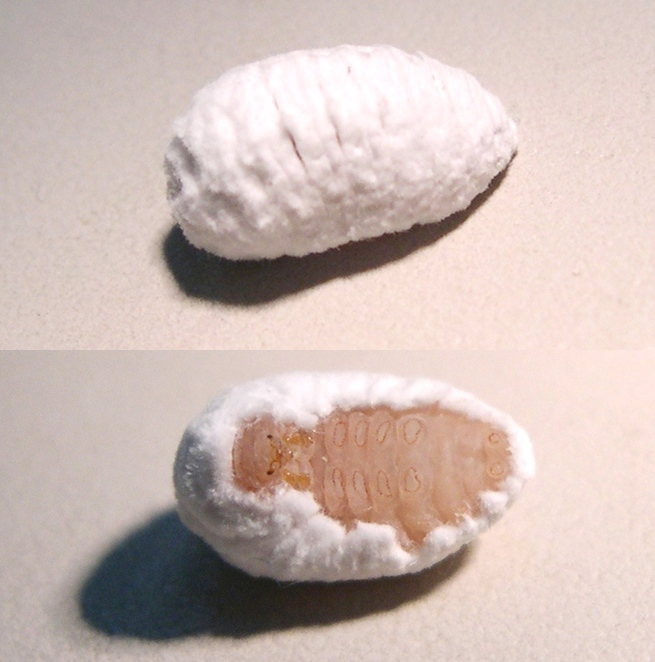
5th instar larva

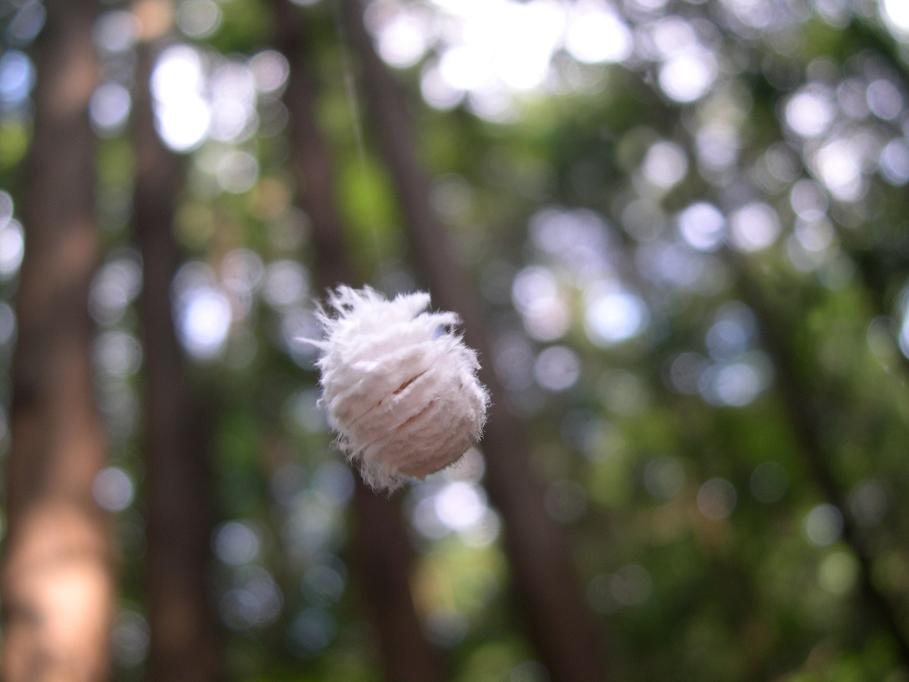
5th instar larva hanging down

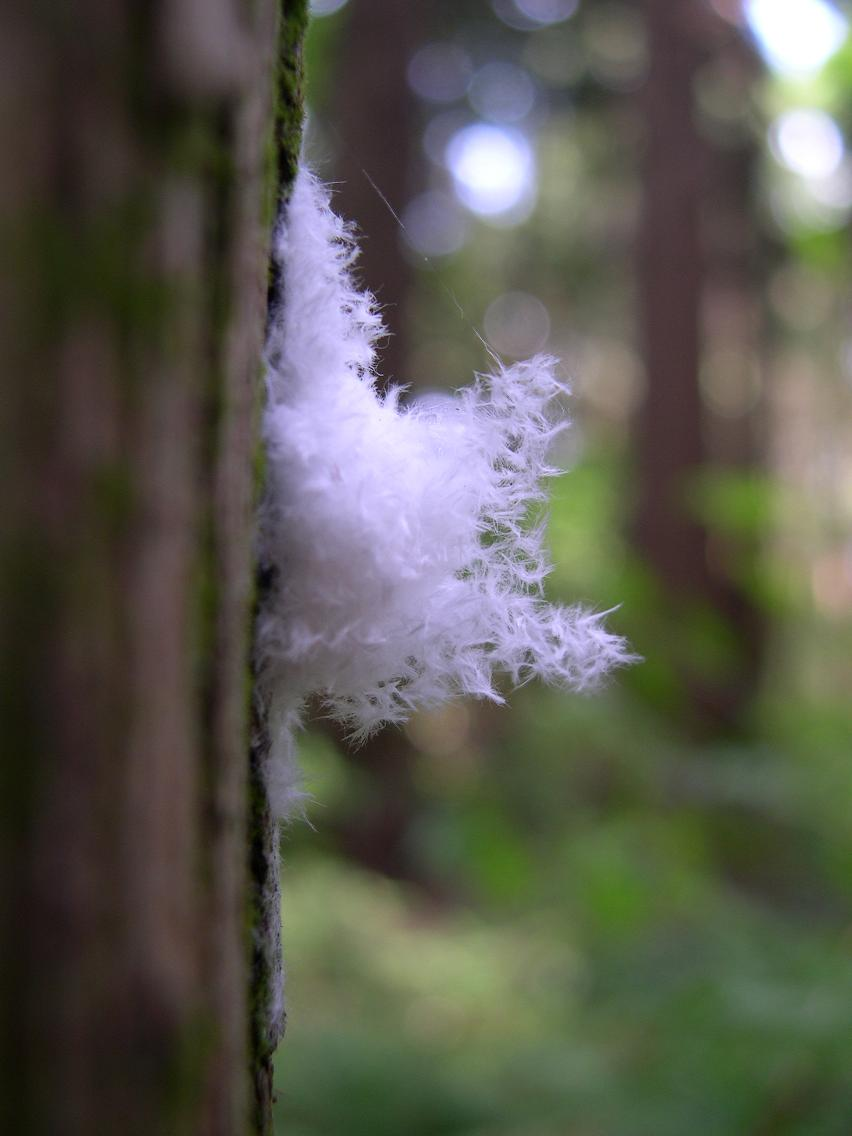
Cocoon

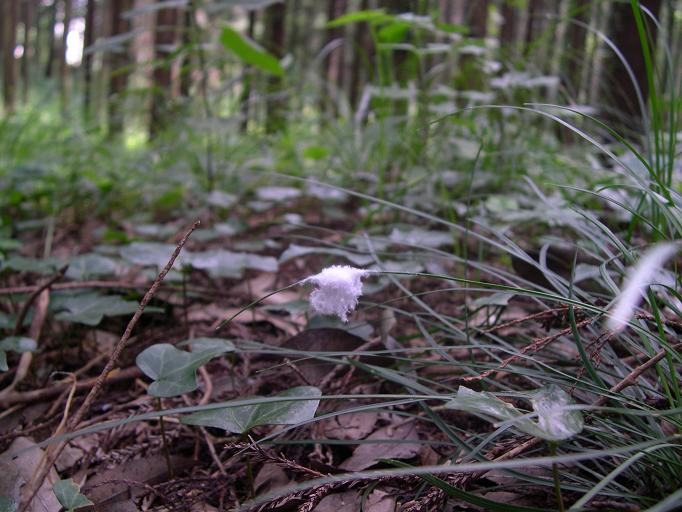
Cocoon on grass

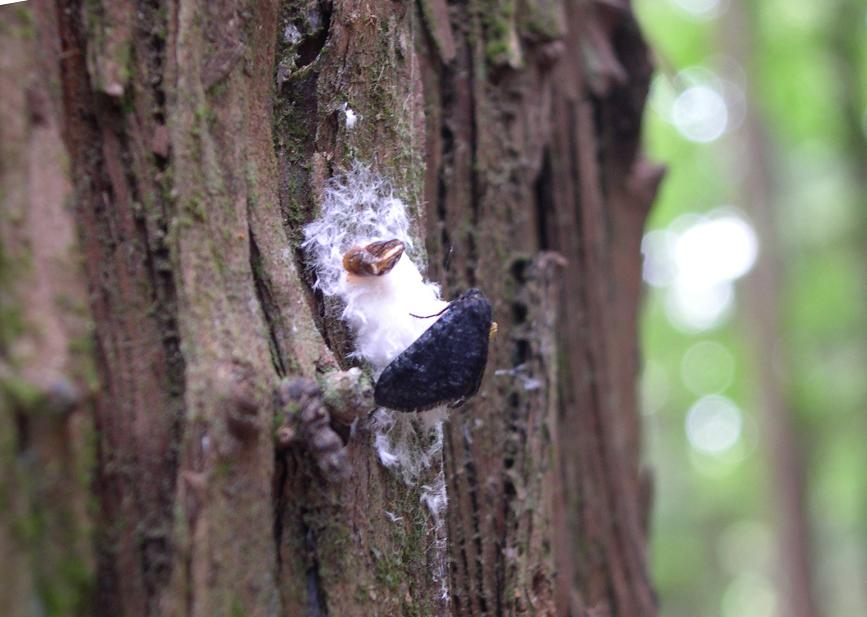
Newly emerged female
