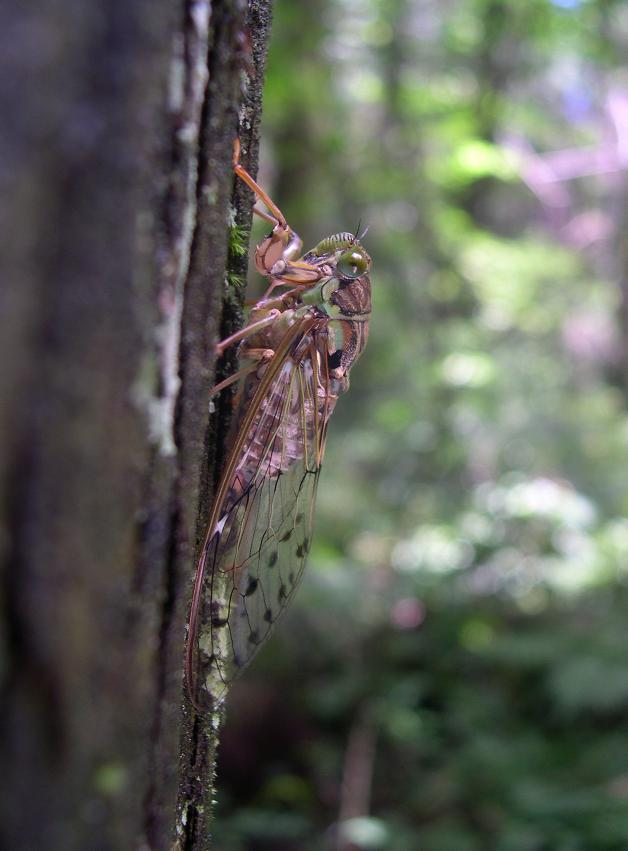
- Tanna japonensis (Female)

Scientific classification
- Kingdom: Animalia
- Phylum: Arthropoda
- Class: Insecta
- Order: Hemiptera
- Suborder: Auchenorrhyncha
- Family: Cicadidae
- Subfamily: Cicadinae
- Tribe: Leptopsaltriini
- Genus: Tanna; Distant, 1905

Synonyms
- Neotanna Kato, 1927; Tana Distant, 1905 and other orthographic variants

= Tanna (cicada) =

Genus of true bugs

Tanna is a genus of cicadas from Southeast Asia and East Asia. In 2010 Lee and Hill placed Tanna in the subtribe Leptopsaltriina, which is now in the tribe Leptopsaltriini together with a number of related genera that also possess abdominal tubercles, including Aetanna, Leptopsaltria, Maua, Nabalua, Purana, and others.

== Species ==
The Global Biodiversity Information Facility lists:

1. Tanna abdominalis (Kato, 1938)
2. Tanna aquilonia Lee & Lei, 2014
3. Tanna auripennis Kato, 1930
4. Tanna bakeri Moulton, 1923
5. Tanna bhutanensis Distant, 1912
6. Tanna conyla (Chou & Lei, 1997)
7. Tanna crassa Lee & Emery, 2020 - Vietnam
8. Tanna fengi Wang, 2024
9. Tanna harpesi Lallemand & Synave, 1953
10. Tanna infuscata Lee & Hayashi, 2004
11. Tanna insignis Distant, 1906
12. Tanna ishigakiana Kato, 1960
13. Tanna japonensis (Distant, 1892)
  - type species (as Pomponia japonensis Distant, 1892)
14. Tanna karenkonis Kato, 1939
15. Tanna kimtaewooi Lee, 2010
16. Tanna obliqua Liu, 1940
17. Tanna ornata Kato, 1940
18. Tanna ornatipennis Esaki, 1933
19. Tanna pallida Distant, 1906
20. Tanna puranoides Boulard, 2008
21. Tanna sayurie Kato, 1926
22. Tanna sinensis (Ôuchi, 1938)
23. Tanna sozanensis Kato, 1926
24. Tanna taipinensis (Matsumura, 1907)
25. Tanna tairikuana Kato, 1940
26. Tanna viridis Kato, 1925
