= Tanna viridis =

Scientific classification
- Kingdom: Animalia
- Phylum: Arthropoda
- Class: Insecta
- Order: Hemiptera
- Suborder: Auchenorrhyncha
- Family: Cicadidae
- Genus: Tanna
- Species: T. viridis

Binomial name
- Tanna viridis Kato, 1925

Species of true bug

Tanna viridis is an insect, a species of cicada of the genus Tanna.
