= Xyleutes xuna =

Scientific classification
- Domain: Eukaryota
- Kingdom: Animalia
- Phylum: Arthropoda
- Class: Insecta
- Order: Lepidoptera
- Family: Cossidae
- Genus: Xyleutes
- Species: X. xuna

Binomial name
- Xyleutes xuna Dyar, 1937

Species of moth

Xyleutes xuna is a moth in the family Cossidae. It was described by Harrison Gray Dyar Jr. in 1937 and is found in Mexico.
