= Xyleutes poam =

Scientific classification
- Domain: Eukaryota
- Kingdom: Animalia
- Phylum: Arthropoda
- Class: Insecta
- Order: Lepidoptera
- Family: Cossidae
- Genus: Xyleutes
- Species: X. poam

Binomial name
- Xyleutes poam (Dyar, 1918)

Synonyms
- Psychonoctua poam Dyar, 1918

Species of moth

Xyleutes poam is a moth in the family Cossidae. It is found in Mexico.
