= Xyleutes benestriata =

Scientific classification
- Kingdom: Animalia
- Phylum: Arthropoda
- Class: Insecta
- Order: Lepidoptera
- Family: Cossidae
- Genus: Xyleutes
- Species: X. benestriata

Binomial name
- Xyleutes benestriata (Hampson, 1904)

Synonyms
- Duomitus benestriata Hampson, 1904

Species of moth

Xyleutes benestriata is a moth in the family Cossidae. It is found on the Bahamas.
