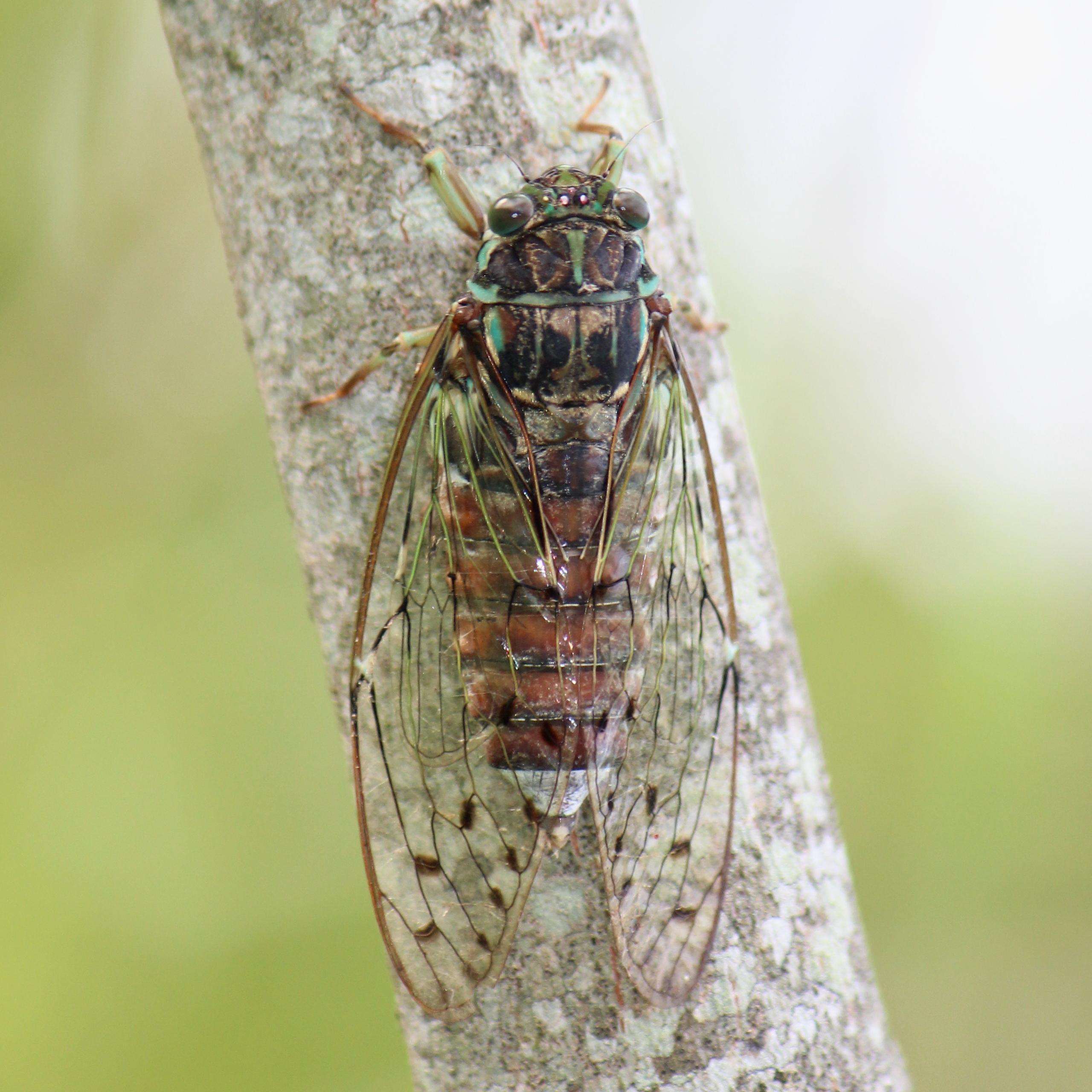

Scientific classification
- Kingdom: Animalia
- Phylum: Arthropoda
- Class: Insecta
- Order: Hemiptera
- Suborder: Auchenorrhyncha
- Family: Cicadidae
- Genus: Tanna
- Species: T. japonensis

Binomial name
- Tanna japonensis Distant, 1892

Subspecies
- T. j. ishigakiana Distant, 1892; T. j. japonensis Kato, 1960

Synonyms
- Pomponia japonensis Distant, 1892

= Tanna japonensis =

Species of true bug

Tanna japonensis, also called the evening cicada or higurashi (Japanese: 日暮, 蜩, 茅蜩, ひぐらし, ヒグラシ), is a species of cicada, a family of insects, and a member of the genus Tanna. It is distributed throughout East Asia, and is most common in Japan. Its shrill call can be heard most often in the morning and evening.

One of its possible kanji names (茅蜩) is derived from the character (茅) for a category of grasses that includes Miscanthus sinensis, a type of reed that it inhabits. In Japan, it is also known as kanakana (カナカナ) because of the noise that it makes.

== Characteristics ==
The adult male has a body length of 28–38 mm (1.1–1.5 in), the female is 21–25 mm (0.8–1.0 in). The male's abdomen is longer and thicker than that of the female, making it easy to distinguish between them. In addition, the intra-abdominal cavity of the male is more developed, giving it a more resonant call.

The body is coloured reddish-brown with green around the compound eye and in the centre and back of the thorax; mountain dwelling specimens tend to be darker.

== Habitat ==
In Japan, their habitat ranges from temperate Hokkaido in the far north to subtropical Amami Ōshima, close to Taiwan (variants and subspecies, such as T. j. ishigakiana), and live in a wide range of habitats. They live in the cypress, cedar, and hardwood forests, from the mountainous regions in Hokkaido to the plains of northern Kyūshū, and even in southern Kyushu, they can be found in slightly higher mountain elevations.

== Ecology ==
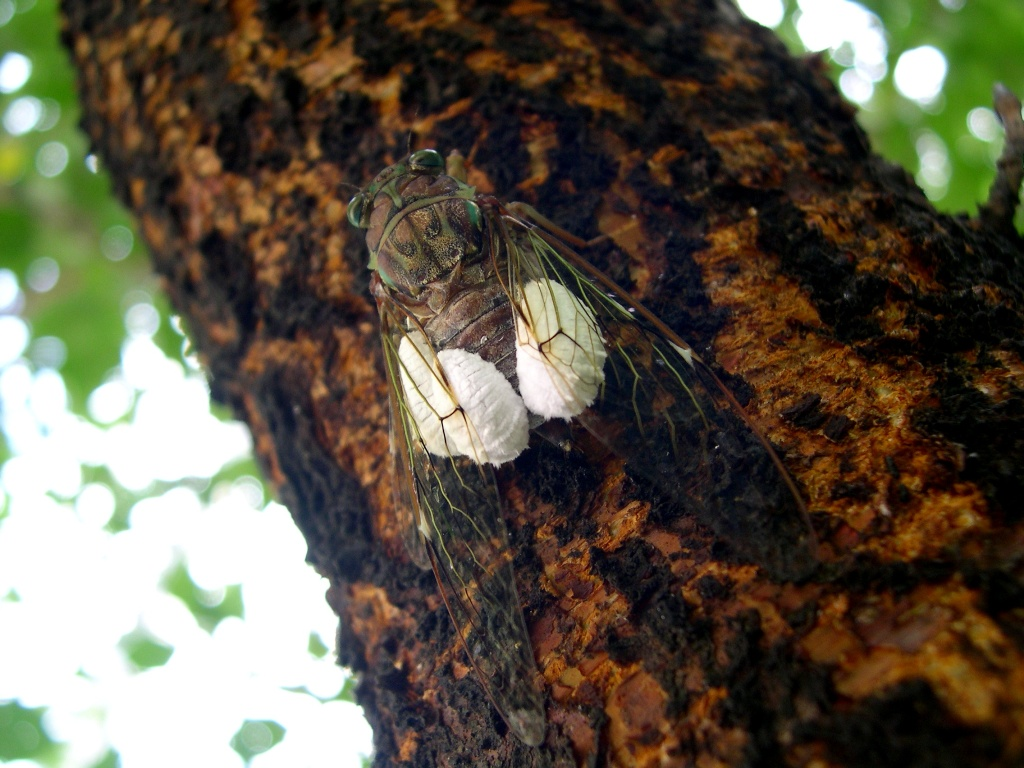
Parasite moth Epipomponia nawai (Lepidoptera: Epipyropidae) caterpillars attached to the abdomen of a female Tanna japonensis

The parasitic moth Epipomponia nawai uses the animal as a host for its eggs. The T. japonensis can also come under attack from flesh flies.

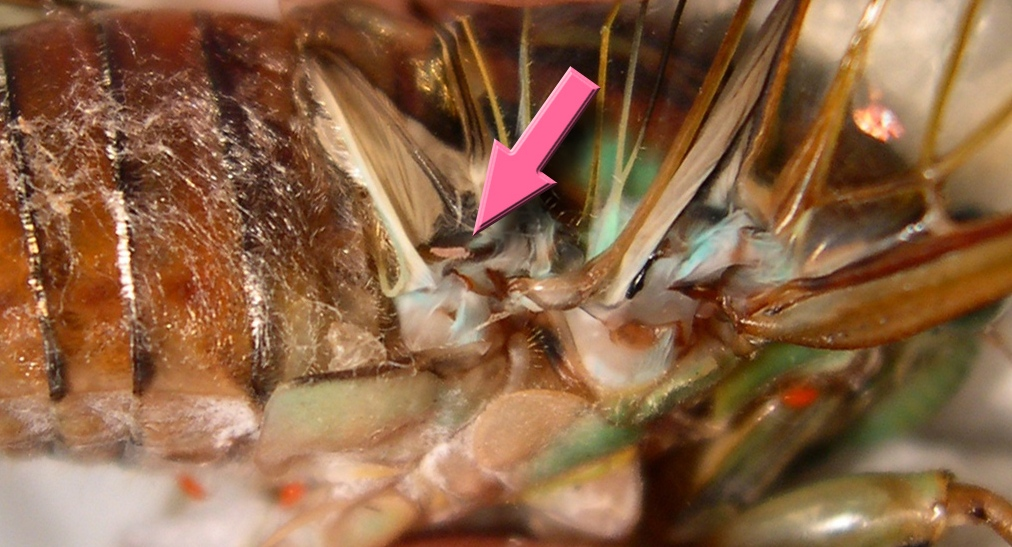
A first-instar larva of Epipomponia nawai (about 0.6 mm long) near the basal area of the right hind wing of a female Tanna japonensis

== Call ==
Sounds of T. japonensis
Hayano Cemetery Park, Kawasaki, Kanagawa, Japan, 6:40PM July 17, 2011 (Some background noise from wind sound)

The peak time for hearing T. japonensis is autumn, but they can also be heard at the end of summer in some regions. From September until mid-October, their calls can be heard almost every day.

The males call with a distinctive, melancholy sound. This occurs before sunrise, and they often sing at twilight or after sunset, in dusk, when the temperature has dropped, or when it becomes cloudy. The call changes with temperature, being correlated with the firing rate of the tymbal nerve.

In Japan, the sound is popularly associated with melancholy, and it has been the subject of literature, and television shows, such as "Summer Evening" and Higurashi no Naku Koro ni (ひぐらしのなく頃に; lit. When the Cicadas Cry), feature it as a sound effect or a plot point. Their calls are quite loud, but do not carry well over distance.

== Subspecies ==
T. j. ishigakiana is found in Ishigaki, an island in Okinawa. Though once listed on the red list, they are no longer thought to be endangered. Their cry is a more metallic sound with a faster tempo.
