= Heteropsyche micromorpha =

Scientific classification
- Kingdom: Animalia
- Phylum: Arthropoda
- Class: Insecta
- Order: Lepidoptera
- Family: Epipyropidae
- Genus: Heteropsyche
- Species: H. micromorpha

Binomial name
- Heteropsyche micromorpha Perkins, 1905

Species of moth

Heteropsyche micromorpha is a moth in the family Epipyropidae. It is found in Australia.

The wingspan is about 7 mm. The forewings are greyish and dark blackish fuscous so arranged that the grey parts form many small roundish spots. The hindwings are blackish fuscous.

The larvae feed on planthoppers of the superfamily Fulgoroidea.
