= Tanna taipinensis =

Scientific classification
- Kingdom: Animalia
- Phylum: Arthropoda
- Clade: Pancrustacea
- Class: Insecta
- Order: Hemiptera
- Suborder: Auchenorrhyncha
- Family: Cicadidae
- Genus: Tanna
- Species: T. taipinensis

Binomial name
- Tanna taipinensis (Matsumura, 1907)

Species of true bug

Tanna taipinensis is an insect, a species of cicada of the genus Tanna.
