= Xyleutes desdemona =

Scientific classification
- Kingdom: Animalia
- Phylum: Arthropoda
- Class: Insecta
- Order: Lepidoptera
- Family: Cossidae
- Genus: Xyleutes
- Species: X. desdemona

Binomial name
- Xyleutes desdemona Dyar & Schaus, 1937

Species of moth

Xyleutes desdemona is a moth in the family Cossidae first described by Harrison Gray Dyar Jr. and William Schaus in 1937. It is found in the Brazilian state of Espírito Santo.
