= Epiricania =

Scientific classification
- Domain: Eukaryota
- Kingdom: Animalia
- Phylum: Arthropoda
- Class: Insecta
- Order: Lepidoptera
- Family: Epipyropidae
- Genus: Epiricania; Kato, 1939

Species
- Epiricania hagoromo; Epiricania melanoleuca

Genus of moths

Epiricania is a genus of moths in the family Epipyropidae described by Kato in 1939.

== Species ==
- Epiricania hagoromo Kato, 1939
- Epiricania melanoleuca (T. B. Fletcher, 1939)
