= Tanna sayurie =

Scientific classification
- Kingdom: Animalia
- Phylum: Arthropoda
- Class: Insecta
- Order: Hemiptera
- Suborder: Auchenorrhyncha
- Family: Cicadidae
- Genus: Tanna
- Species: T. sayurie

Binomial name
- Tanna sayurie Kato, 1926

Species of true bug

Tanna sayurie is an insect, a species of cicada of the genus Tanna. It was first found at Funkiko near Mount Arisan, Taiwan.
