= Tanna infuscata =

Scientific classification
- Kingdom: Animalia
- Phylum: Arthropoda
- Class: Insecta
- Order: Hemiptera
- Suborder: Auchenorrhyncha
- Family: Cicadidae
- Genus: Tanna
- Species: T. infuscata

Binomial name
- Tanna infuscata Lee & Hayashi, 2004

Species of true bug

Tanna infuscata is a species of cicada of the genus Tanna found in Taiwan.
