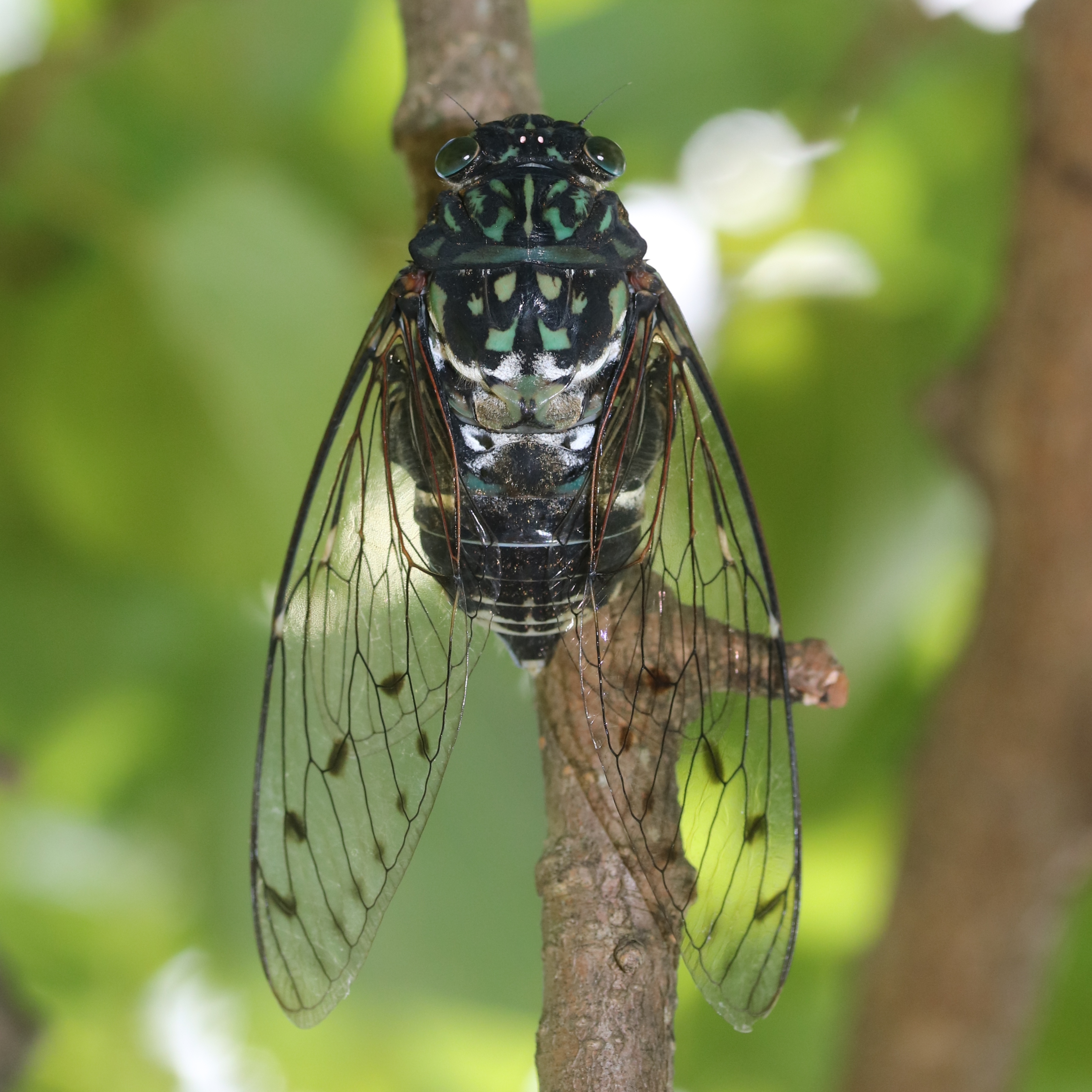
- On Mount Ibuki, Japan

Scientific classification
- Kingdom: Animalia
- Phylum: Arthropoda
- Clade: Pancrustacea
- Class: Insecta
- Order: Hemiptera
- Suborder: Auchenorrhyncha
- Family: Cicadidae
- Genus: Hyalessa
- Species: H. maculaticollis

Binomial name
- Hyalessa maculaticollis Motschulsky, 1866
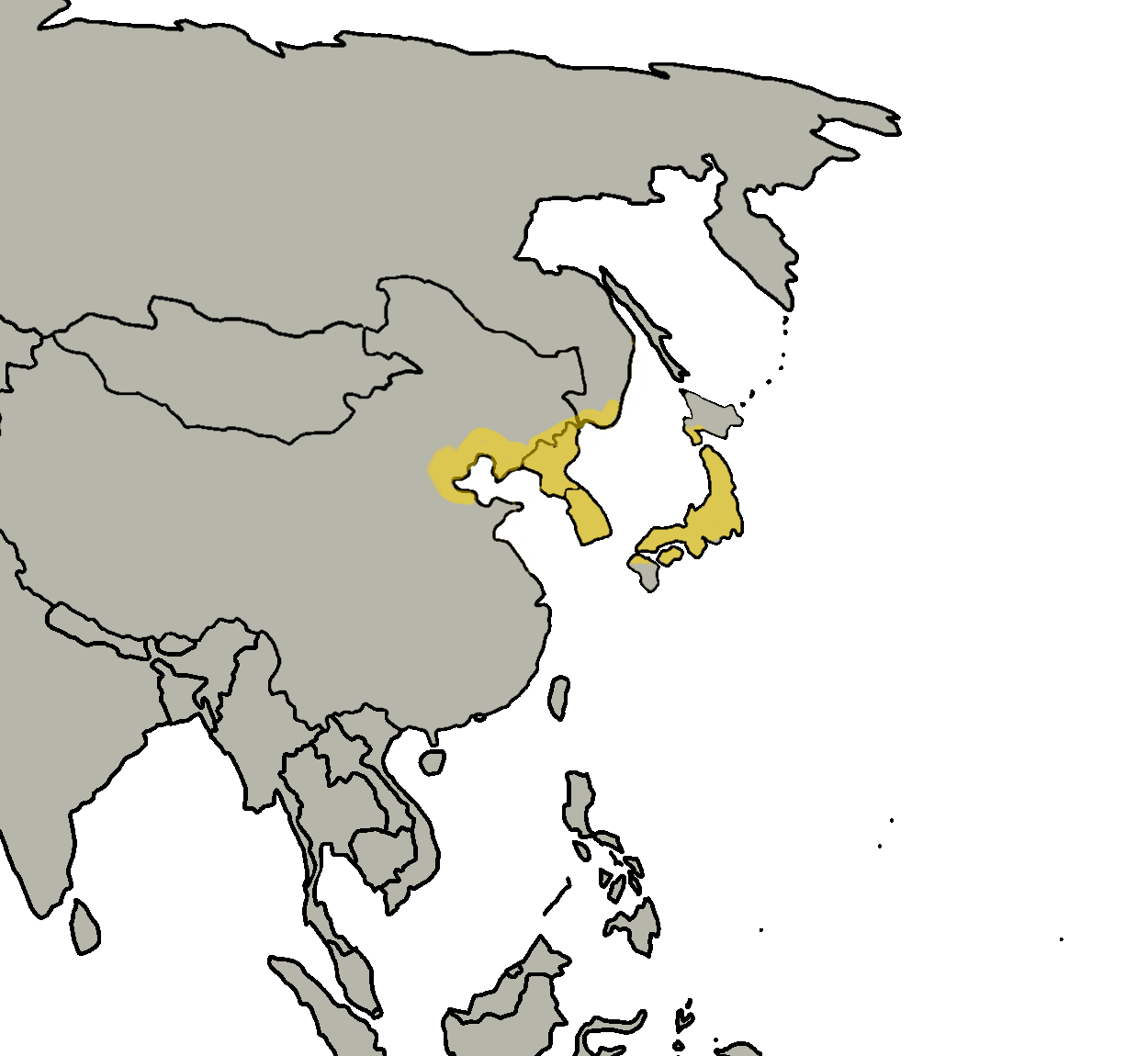
- Rough map showing the distribution of Hyalessa maculaticollis

Synonyms
- Oncotympana maculaticollis Hyalessa fuscata

Audio
- Sound of male Hyalessa maculaticollis in Japanese mainland

= Hyalessa maculaticollis =

Species of true bug

Hyalessa maculaticollis is a species of cicada found in Northeast Asia in the order Hemiptera.

Regarding the classification, the genus of the species was changed from Hyalessa to Oncotympana because of its difference from the species found in the Philippines.

== Common names ==
In Japan, the name of this cicada is derived from the sound it makes. It is known as minminzemi (ミンミンゼミ, literally, minmin cicada) because of its well-known male song that sounds like 'mi—n, minminminminmi...' (Japanese: ミーンミンミンミンミンミー...).

In Korea, it has the name chammaemi (참매미) (literally 'true cicada' or 'common cicada'), indicating the commonality of this species in Korea.

In China, it is called diāo liáo (蛁蟟).

== Distribution ==
Hyalessa maculaticollis is found in China, Japan, the Korean Peninsula and maritime areas of Russia. Individuals in Korea, Eastern China and Far East Russia were considered to be Hyalessa fuscata (Distant, 1905) but recent taxonomic data shows H. fuscata is a synonym of H. maculaticollis.

In Japan, they are distributed from the Oshima Peninsula in southern Hokkaido to Honshu, Kyushu, and their surrounding islands (Tsushima, Koshiki Islands). Their distribution is limited by the cold northern climates and have forced them to migrate to middle and southern areas of Japan. However there are some isolated habitats that can presumably survive in Hokkaido's cold climates due to the region's prevalence of high geothermal heat such as hot springs and volcanic activity. These areas include Jozankei Onsen (Sapporo City) and the Wakoto Peninsula in Eastern Hokkaido.

According to local researchers, nymphs of Hyalessa maculaticollis found in northern regions do not climb trees and instead emerge on a type of bamboo species, Kuma Bamboo Grass. In eastern Japan, it inhabits flat forests and is often found in urban green areas, whereas in western Japan they prefer mountainous areas with slightly higher altitudes.

On the Asian continent, it inhabits northern China and Korea, and is found mostly in urban areas. Their song differs in these regions compared to Japan, resembling a "Minminminminme" song without the "Mean" at the beginning (cicada dialect). However, the songs from Tsushima are very similar to this, and are noticeably different from those found in Tokyo. With Meimuna opalifera also, there is a slightly different song between Japanese and continental counterparts.

In China, there are many in Beijing and Dalian, especially in Dalian.

This species is considered to be very common in Korea, it is widely distributed from large urban areas to mountainous areas. H. maculaticollis was the dominant species in all three habitats. H. maculaticollis and C. atrata comprised a minimum of 75.2% of all cicadas across all habitats and sampling periods.

=== Different habitat distribution in each region ===
The range of distribution of Hyalessa maculaticollis in Japan is likely to be limited by the climatic conditions of the land. Therefore, it has a very distorted distribution compared to other cicadas such as Graptopsaltria nigrofuscata. However, this tends to be seen not only in Hyalessa maculaticuollis but also in almost all insects, but this tendency is particularly strong in Hyalessa maculaticollis. This means that Hyalessa maculaticollis is highly sensitive to climate change and is a delicate insect.

On the other hand, the distribution in Korea is the opposite of that in Japan. In the case of Korea, this species is common in low-lying urban and mountainous areas, but Graptopsaltria nigrofuscata is only observed in mountainous areas and are rarely observed in large urban areas.

== Description ==
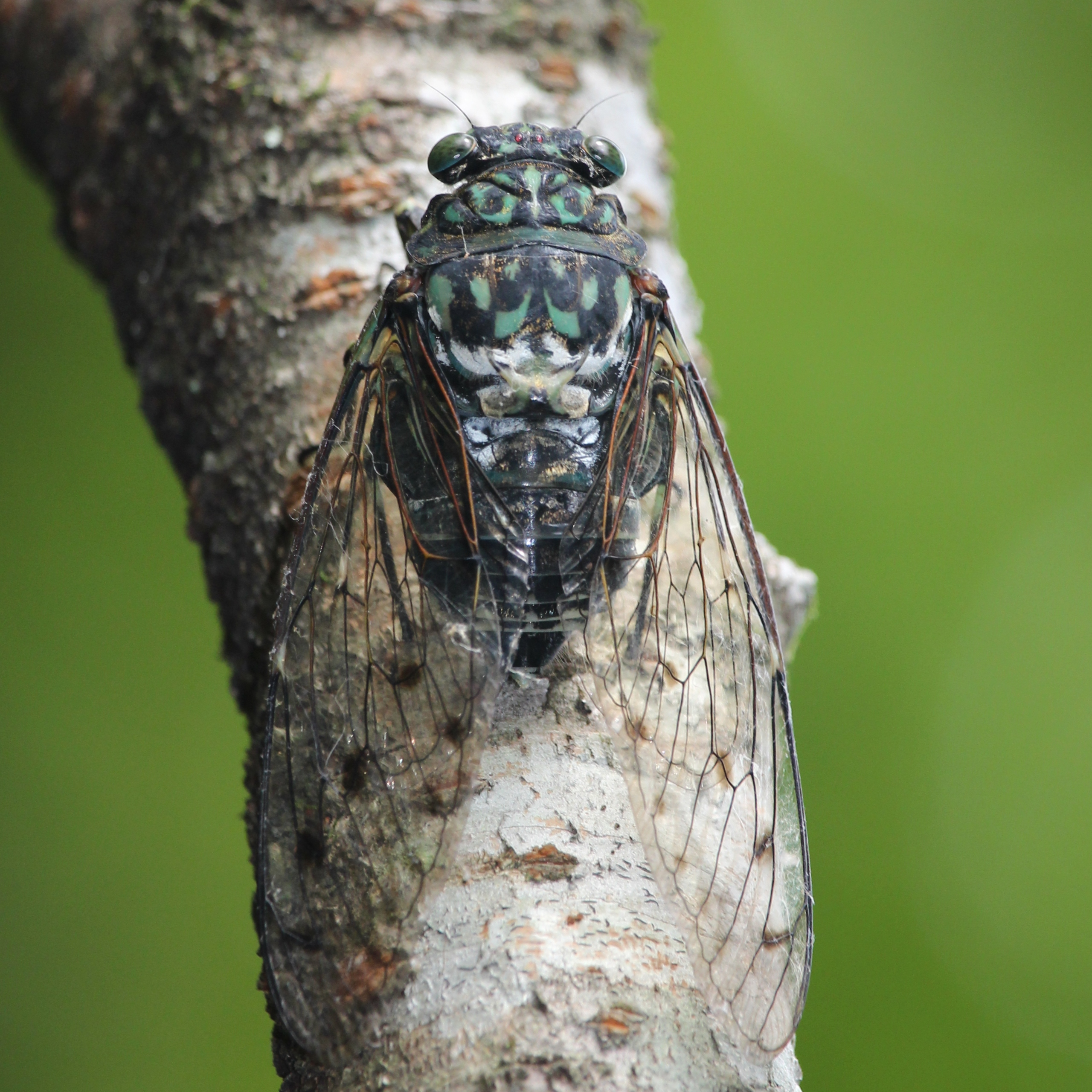
Hyalessa maculaticollis in Mount Yōrō, Gifu prefecture, Japan

The colour of Hyalessa maculaticollis varies between green and black depending on the location. Only the males make a calling sound, and this changes depending on the location. Japanese cicadas have a call that sounds like 'min—minminminminmi...' (Japanese: ミーンミンミンミンミンミー...). Meanwhile, the sound of Korean cicadas is like 'maemmaemmaemmaem...mi...' (Korean: 맴맴맴맴...미) and a longer note duration (maeee—mm....) is found in the latter half of the sound. The sound of this species affected the Korean word '매미' ('cicada'). Chinese cicadas sound similar to Korean cicadas.

Typical adults grow up to about 33–36 mm in length. It has a narrow head and a thick and short abdomen, with an overall egg-shaped body. However, the wings are large relative to the body, and are almost the same size as the brown cicada when the wings are included.

The body color is white near the boundary between the chest and abdomen, but the others have light blue or green spots on a black background, and the body color is relatively bright for a Japanese cicada. There are also individuals with almost no black spots and mainly bluish green, and these are called mikadominmin (ミカドミンミン). The shell is dull and about the size of a brown cicada.

Also, unlike brown cicadas and Platypleura kaempferi, this cicada lives in large numbers – like Tanna japonensis and Terpnosia nigricosta (エゾハルゼミ), in Tokyo, Yokohama City, Kanagawa Prefecture, Sendai City, Miyagi Prefecture, etc.

=== Theoretical vulnerability to heat ===
There is a theory that Hyalessa maculaticollis is more vulnerable to heat than other populous cicadas in Japan such as brown cicadas and bear cicadas.

In Biology of Cicadas written by Masayo Kato, a well-known entomologist, "In the Kanto region, Hyalessa maculaticollis and Tanna japonensis live everywhere on the flat ground, but in the Kansai region, they occupy mountainous and flat terrain. This speculation was made from the temperature difference between high and low altitudes. However, it does not mention the summer heat, in which cicadas live most of their lifecycle.

==== Contradictions of the theory ====
There are many doubts about the habitat situation that "Hyalessa maculaticollis is vulnerable to heat". For example, cicadas also inhabit Kumagaya and Kofu, where the summer heat is severe. If it is vulnerable to heat, they would be more prevalent in other seasons such as fall, or mostly inhabit western Japan where the temperatures are less severe. There is a common myth that the mikadominmin type of cicada has acquired heat resistance despite no black pigment on its body. However, they are frequently found in less severe temperatures and emerge after the peak of summer. Specifically, Tobishima in Yamagata Prefecture and Awashima in Niigata Prefecture are typical examples. Tobishima has a particularly high probability of occurrence of mikadominmin (more than 10% of the total), but the summer temperature is low on all islands and it is easy to spend.

=== Tendency to prefer slopes ===
Hyalessa maculaticollis often inhabits trees that grow on slopes as the larvae prefer the soil of these sloped terrain. Even within the 23 wards of Tokyo, most of the Minminzemi are found in sloped and flat terrain whereas brown cicadas do not. Hyalessa maculaticollis larvae prefer soil with a slight degree of dryness, which soil from slopes provide as slopes are easily exposed to the sun during the day and tends to be in a high temperature dry state. Hyalessa maculaticollis originally inhabited along the valleys of the low mountains and less along the ridges as valleys are more likely to be hot and drier than the ridges.

=== Relationship with Cryptotympana species ===
==== With C. faciallis in Japan ====
It is said that H. maculaticollis and Cryptotympana facialis have separate habitats. The two types are different species, and it is natural that there is a difference in ecology, and people simply perceive the difference in habitat location. For example, the time when cicadas appear, the brightness of trees and forests, the thickness of tree trunks, and the time of ringing vary depending on the species. On the other hand, as the density of cicadas increases, the distribution of cicadas expands, and the habitat and the period of singing may overlap. In fact, there are areas that appear at the same time in H. maculaticollis and C. facialis, such as Katsurahama in Kochi Prefecture, Atsumi Peninsula in Aichi Prefecture, and Izu Peninsula. In these areas, there are times when Hyalessa maculaticus and C. facialis are singing at the same time. There is such a period of simultaneous ringing suggests that one is not in a situation of avoiding or driving the other, that is, there is no clear segregation between H. maculaticollis and C. facialis.

C. facialis is gradually becoming established in the coastal areas of Tokyo, and it is expected that the time when the number of C. fasciata will increase and the time when H. maculaticollis will appear will eventually coincide with the time when it will song at the same time.

Below are various theories about H. maculaticollis and C. facialis.

- The sounds of H. maculaticollis and C. facialis songs are completely different as far as you can hear them with the human ear, but the base sounds of these two types of cicadas are almost the same, and if you play the sounds slowly, the sounds of H. maculaticollis if it is played back quickly, will be similar to the song of the C. facialis. It is said that the C. facialis and the H. maculaticollis are separated from each other because the cicadas of both species have habitats in common.
- There is a theory that the outbreak of H. maculaticollis begins when the C. facialis is almost over. This is the case in areas where both species of western Japan live. In particular, it seems that there is a clear segregation in the urban area of Higashi-Hiroshima City, Hiroshima Prefecture.
- Both H. maculaticollis and C. facialis are species that often squeal in the morning, and there is a theory that this requires timely segregation of both species of cicadas.

However, H. maculaticollis is a cicada that sings all day long, and there is little evidence that both species need to be considered separate species.

== Life cycle ==
Their median life cycle from egg to natural adult death is around three years.

Hyalessa maculaticollis singing in Tokyo, Japan.

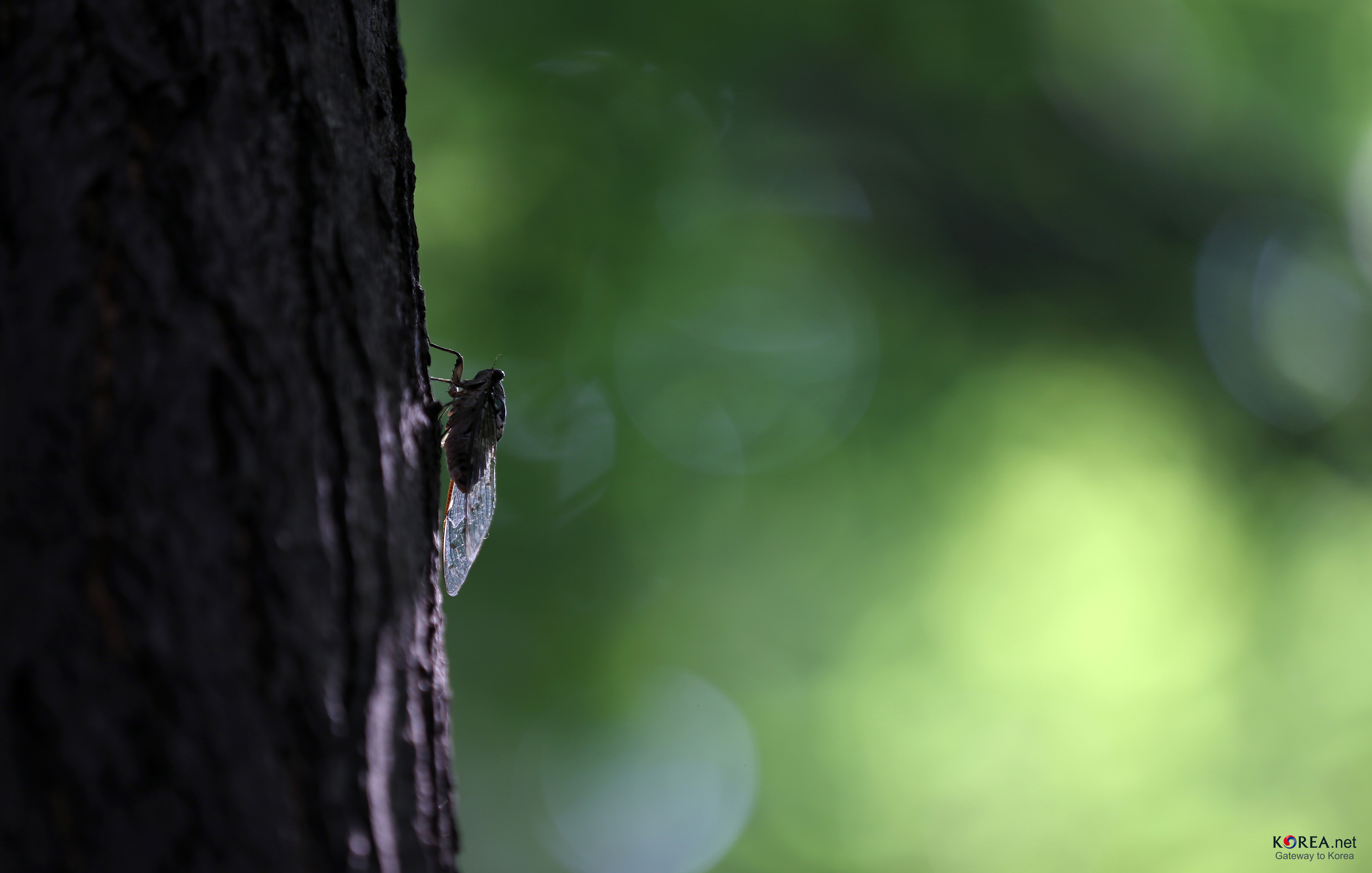
A male Hyalessa fuscata (now synonymized as H. maculaticollis) in Seoul, South Korea.

== Song ==
The male of H. maculaticollis, a summer tradition, often squeals in the morning, and the song is loud and clearly audible to the human ear. The standard calling song is "Mean Min Min Min Min Me ...", and is repeated consecutively about three times, or it may last five or more times.

=== Association with East Asian summer traditions ===
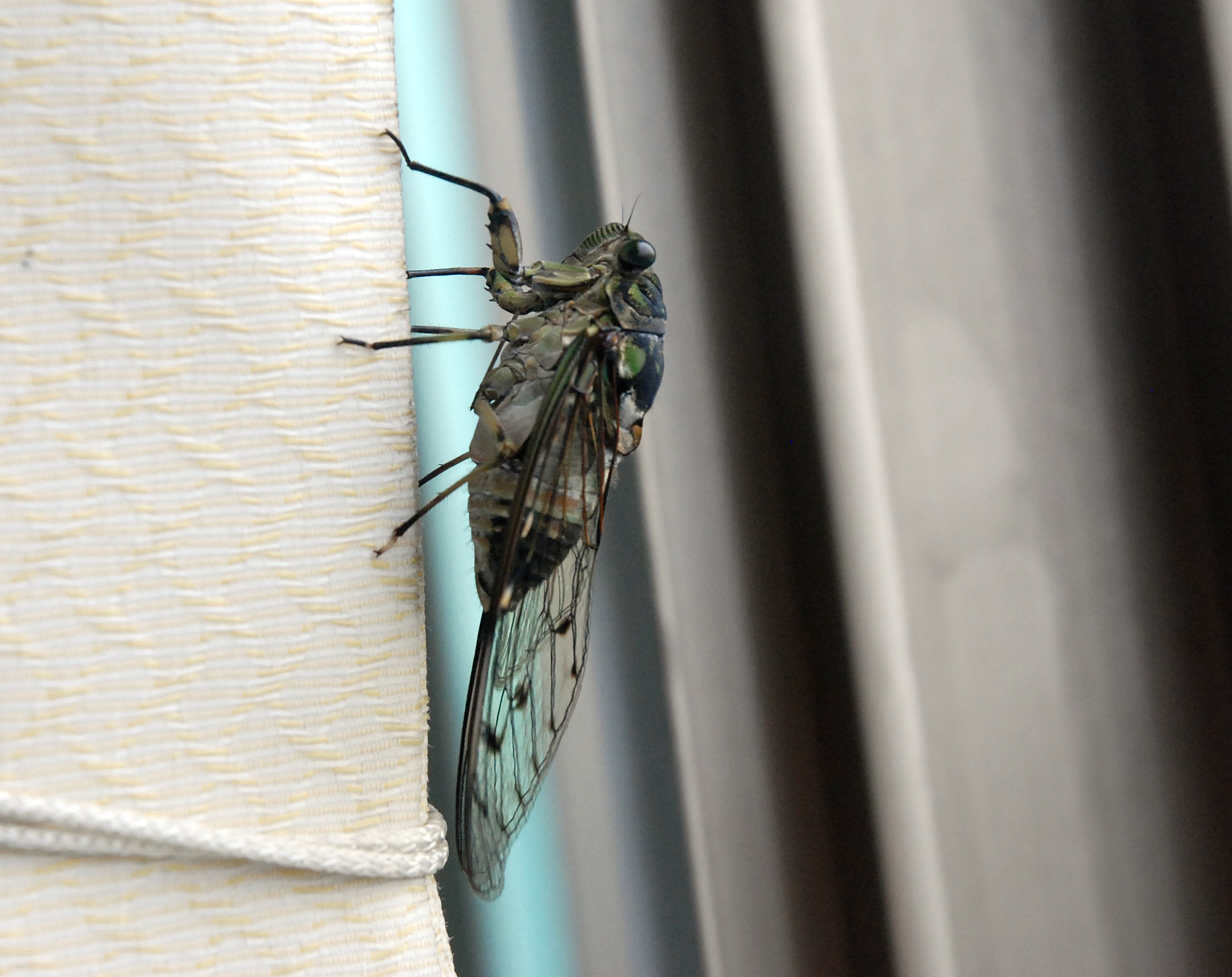
H. maculaticollis in urban area. Seoul, South Korea

The song of Hyalessa maculaticollis is used as sound effects in many East Asian medias to depict the summer season. Other cicada songs can be heard at the same time and symbolizes the sound of the summer season. However in the urban areas of Hokkaido and Aomori prefecture, the cicada song is not associated with summer as they do not inhabit those areas.

=== Changes in their first singing season of the year ===
The first sound of H. maculaticollis was observed in various places including the Japan Meteorological Agency until 2020. The transition of biological season observation is used as a guideline for climate change such as flowering of Yoshino cherry tree, but there is a peculiar tendency in the transition of the first singing season. For example, in the Kanto Koshin region and Tohoku region, the first song of H. maculaticollis tends to begin earlier, while in the Hokuriku region and Kochi prefecture, it tends to occur later.

This trend has become particularly noticeable since 2010, and in recent years, as the earliest H. maculaticollis in Japan occurs in Kumagaya City, Saitama Prefecture around mid-July. For this reason, for people living in the Kanto region, H. maculaticollis is now a representation of the midsummer.

=== Conditions for H. maculaticollis to appear ===
In recent years, the first sound of H. maculaticollis has tended to be earlier in the Kanto Koshin region and the Tohoku region. If the rise in average temperature due to global warming correlates with the first sound of H. maculaticollis, there is no alarming issue of having the first song to occur earlier nationwide, but there is not much correlation with the first song compared to other regions. This suggests that there are other necessary parameters besides temperature as a trigger for the appearance of H. maculaticollis.

As mentioned previously, it is possible that H. maculaticollis prefers slopes, that is, dry soil. Here, the conditions for the soil to dry include (1) low rainfall, (2) high sunshine, (3) well-drained geology such as andosols, and (4) slopes. If the rise in underground temperature in a dry state triggers the appearance of H. maculaticollis, it will be easier to explain the transition of the initial sound of H. maculaticollis in recent years.

=== Impact of the rainy season ===
It is considered that the first song of H. maculaticollis is greatly affected by the amount of precipitation in summer, that is, the rainy season (monsoon). The rainy season varies from year to year and from region to region, but as an average feature, precipitation tends to increase toward the south and west. In addition, the normal value after the rainy season is earlier in the south and later in the northern regions.

In western Japan, where there is a lot of rainfall in the summer and the soil is clayey and has good water retention which limits the H. maculaticollis to inhabit those areas. Except for slopes, stable observations of Hatsune have been recorded in the Setouchi region, where precipitation is relatively low, or in the Sanin region, where andosols spread.

Kobe City and Sumoto City in Hyogo Prefecture canceled the biological seasonal observation on the way, but Matsue City continued until the end of the observation in 2020. Normal values at these points are around late July.

In East Japan, where the amount of precipitation in summer is relatively low and the Andosols and the Kanto Loam Formation spread, H. maculaticollis is widely distributed throughout flat lands, and the first sound tends to be earlier year by year. Among them, Yamagata, Nagano, Kofu, Kumagaya, etc., where precipitation is low, have the earliest first ringing even when viewed nationwide.

In Tokyo and Yokohama, where there is more rainfall than these points, the first sound is delayed a little, and in Maebashi and Utsunomiya, where there is relatively much rainfall in the Kanto region, the normal value of the first sound is in August.

In Nagano Prefecture, the time of the first ringing is more than 10 days off in Nagano City and Iida City, and the normal value in Iida City in the Nanshin region (where biological season observation has already been completed) is early August.

Cicadas tend to appear after the soil dries a little more than after the rainy season. In addition, although biological season observations have not been made, it also applies to the fact that H. maculaticollis begins to sing during the late summer in various parts of western Japan such as Kyoto. On the other hand, Kochi Prefecture and the Hokuriku region are areas where the first songs are being heard later year by year. Kochi Prefecture's first ring in 2020 was August 1, the latest since the start of observation records in 1981 [6], which is believed to be due to the record long rains in July.

In the Hokuriku region, the number of years when the first singing is not observed is increasing. It is possible that the natural environment of these areas has changed due to increased daily and hourly precipitation, and the population of H. maculaticollis has decreased.

First song (of the year) of Minminzemi Normal value (excerpt from the website of the Japan Meteorological Agency)

Observation point	Normal value (1991–2020)	Old normal value (1981–2010)	Difference	Remarks
Tokyo	July 21	July 21	No difference	Observed since 1996
Yokohama	July 20	July 24	−4 days	
Kumagaya	July 21	July 26	−5 days	July 15 on average for 10 years from 2011
Sendai	July 26	August 1	−6 days	The change in normal value is the largest
Yamagata	July 21	July 25	−4 days	
Maebashi	August 5	August 7	−2 days	
Nagano	July 19	July 21	−2 days	
Kanazawa	August 8	August 6	+2 days	
Matsue	July 23	July 24	−1 day	
Kochi	July 12	July 11	+1 day	July 16 on average for 10 years from 2011
Kobe	－	July 27	－	End of observation in 2002
Iida	－	August 3	－	2006 observation end

=== Affections in the start and end of calling ===
Studies on sound initiation and termination have been conducted in the Korean population.
