= Heteropsyche stenomorpha =

Scientific classification
- Kingdom: Animalia
- Phylum: Arthropoda
- Class: Insecta
- Order: Lepidoptera
- Family: Epipyropidae
- Genus: Heteropsyche
- Species: H. stenomorpha

Binomial name
- Heteropsyche stenomorpha Perkins, 1905

Species of moth

Heteropsyche stenomorpha is a moth in the family Epipyropidae. It is found in Australia.

The wingspan is about 8 mm. The forewings are black or blackish fuscous and rather roughly scaled. The hindwings are like the forewings, but more finely scaled.

The larvae feed on planthoppers of the superfamily Fulgoroidea.
