= Xyleutes terrafirma =

Scientific classification
- Kingdom: Animalia
- Phylum: Arthropoda
- Class: Insecta
- Order: Lepidoptera
- Family: Cossidae
- Genus: Xyleutes
- Species: X. terrafirma

Binomial name
- Xyleutes terrafirma (Schaus, 1911)

Synonyms
- Psychonoctua terrafirma Schaus, 1911

Species of moth

Xyleutes terrafirma is a moth in the family Cossidae. It was described by William Schaus in 1911 and is found in Costa Rica.
