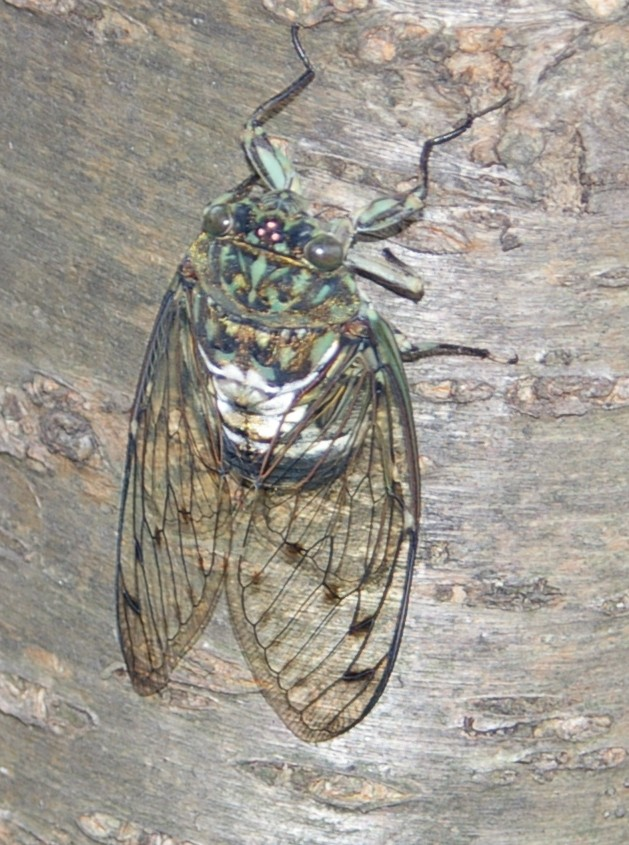
- Hyalessa maculaicollis

Scientific classification
- Domain: Eukaryota
- Kingdom: Animalia
- Phylum: Arthropoda
- Class: Insecta
- Order: Hemiptera
- Suborder: Auchenorrhyncha
- Superfamily: Cicadoidea
- Family: Cicadidae
- Subfamily: Cicadinae
- Tribe: Sonatini; Lee, 2011
- Genus: Hyalessa; China, 1925

Type species
- Hyalessa ronshana China, 1925

Synonyms
- Sonata Lee, 2010

= Hyalessa =

Genus of true bugs

Hyalessa is a genus of cicadas in the subfamily Cicadinae, found in the Palearctic and East Asia. It is the sole genus in the tribe Sonatini.

== Species ==
These species belong to the genus Hyalessa:

- Hyalessa batabgensis Wang, Hayashi & Wei, 2014
- Hyalessa ella (Lei & Chou, 1997)
- Hyalessa expansa (Walker, F., 1858)
- Hyalessa maculaticollis (Motschulsky, 1866)
- Hyalessa mahoni (Distant, 1906)
- Hyalessa melanoptera (Distant, 1904)
- Hyalessa obnubila (Distant, 1888)
- Hyalessa ronshana China, 1925
- Hyalessa scutata Puissant & Lee
- Hyalessa stratoria (Distant, 1905)
- Hyalessa virescens (Distant, 1905)
- Hyalessa wangi Wang, Qiu & Wei, 2016
