= Ommatissopyrops =

Scientific classification
- Kingdom: Animalia
- Phylum: Arthropoda
- Class: Insecta
- Order: Lepidoptera
- Family: Epipyropidae
- Genus: Ommatissopyrops; Bivar de Sousa & Quartau, 1998

Genus of moths

Ommatissopyrops is a genus of moths in the Epipyropidae family.

== Species ==
- Ommatissopyrops lusitanicus Bivar de Sousa & Quartau, 1998
- Ommatissopyrops schawerdae (Zerny, 1929)
