= Anopyrops =

Scientific classification
- Kingdom: Animalia
- Phylum: Arthropoda
- Class: Insecta
- Order: Lepidoptera
- Family: Epipyropidae
- Genus: Anopyrops; Jordan, 1928
- Species: A. corticina

Binomial name
- Anopyrops corticina Jordan, 1928

Species of moth

Anopyrops is a monotypic moth genus in the family Epipyropidae. Anopyrops corticina, its sole species, was described by Karl Jordan in 1928 and is found in French Guiana and Suriname.
