= Protacraga =

Scientific classification
- Kingdom: Animalia
- Phylum: Arthropoda
- Class: Insecta
- Order: Lepidoptera
- Family: Epipyropidae
- Genus: Protacraga; Hopp, 1924

Genus of moths

Protacraga is a genus of moths in the Epipyropidae family.

== Species ==
- Protacraga micans Hopp, 1924

== Former species ==
- Protacraga nigerella (Dognin, 1923)
