= Heteropsyche poecilochroma =

Scientific classification
- Kingdom: Animalia
- Phylum: Arthropoda
- Class: Insecta
- Order: Lepidoptera
- Family: Epipyropidae
- Genus: Heteropsyche
- Species: H. poecilochroma

Binomial name
- Heteropsyche poecilochroma Perkins, 1905

Synonyms
- Heteropsyche dyscrita Perkins, 1905; Heteropsyche melanochroma Perkins, 1905; Epipyrops doddi Rothschild, 1906

Species of moth

Heteropsyche poecilochroma is a moth in the family Epipyropidae. It is found in Australia.

The wingspan is about 10 mm. The forewings are greyish fuscous strigulated with dark and brownish fuscous. The hindwings are dark fuscous and somewhat brownish tinged.

The larvae feed on planthoppers of the superfamily Fulgoroidea.
