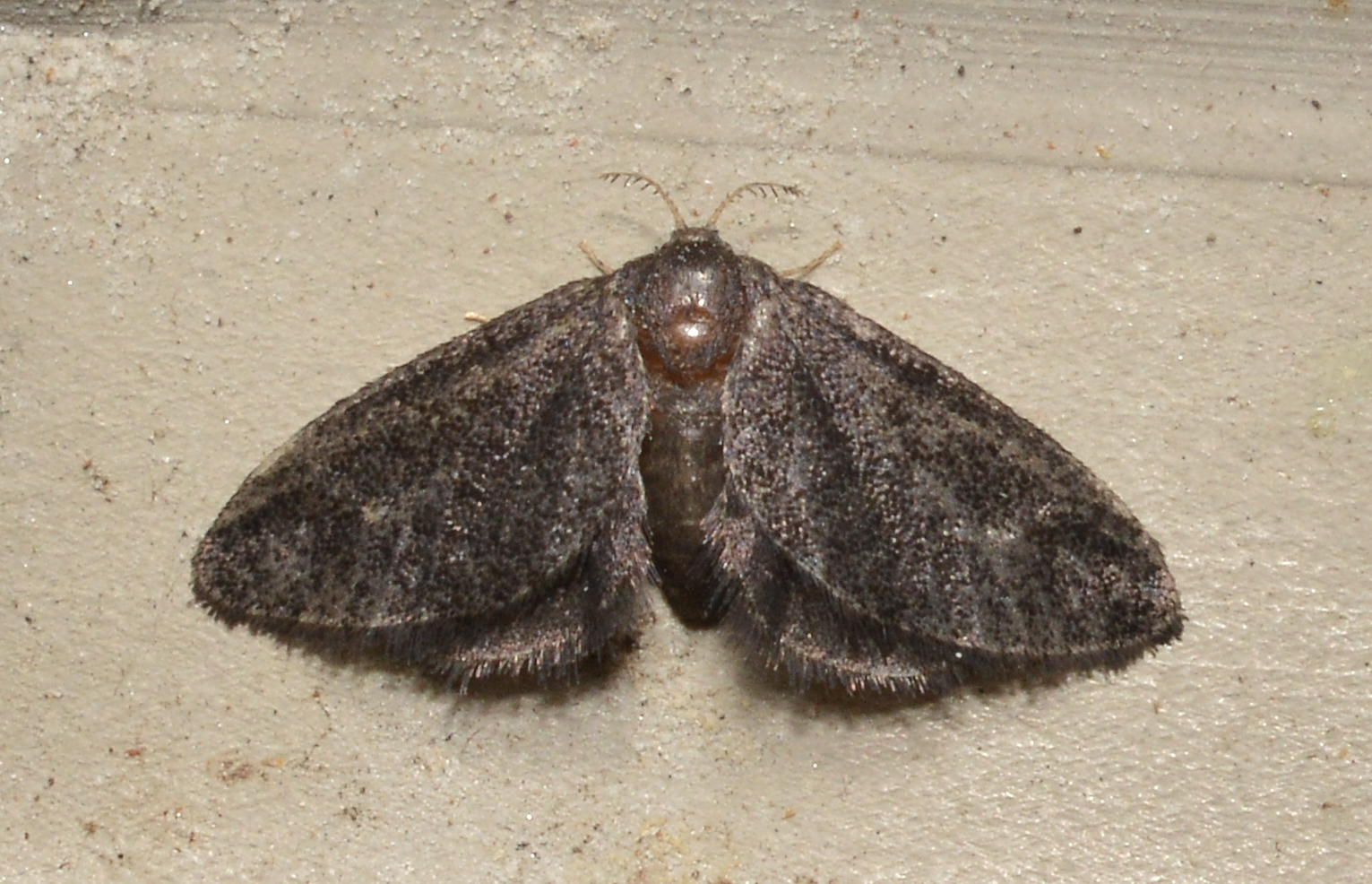

Scientific classification
- Kingdom: Animalia
- Phylum: Arthropoda
- Clade: Pancrustacea
- Class: Insecta
- Order: Lepidoptera
- Family: Epipyropidae
- Genus: Epipyrops
- Species: E. exigua

Binomial name
- Epipyrops exigua (H. Edwards, 1882)

Synonyms
- Pseudopsyche exigua H. Edwards, 1882; Epipyrops barberiana Dyar, 1902; Fulgoraecia barberiana

= Epipyrops exigua =

Species of moth

Epipyrops exigua or Fulgoraecia exigua, the planthopper parasite moth, is a moth in the Epipyropidae family. It was described by Henry Edwards in 1882. It is found in North America, where it has been recorded from New Jersey and Pennsylvania to central Florida, west to Missouri, Texas, New Mexico, Arizona and California.

The caterpillar of Epipyrops exigua feeds on the haemolymph of planthoppers and cicadas.

The wingspan is 8–13 mm. Adults are on wing from June to October.

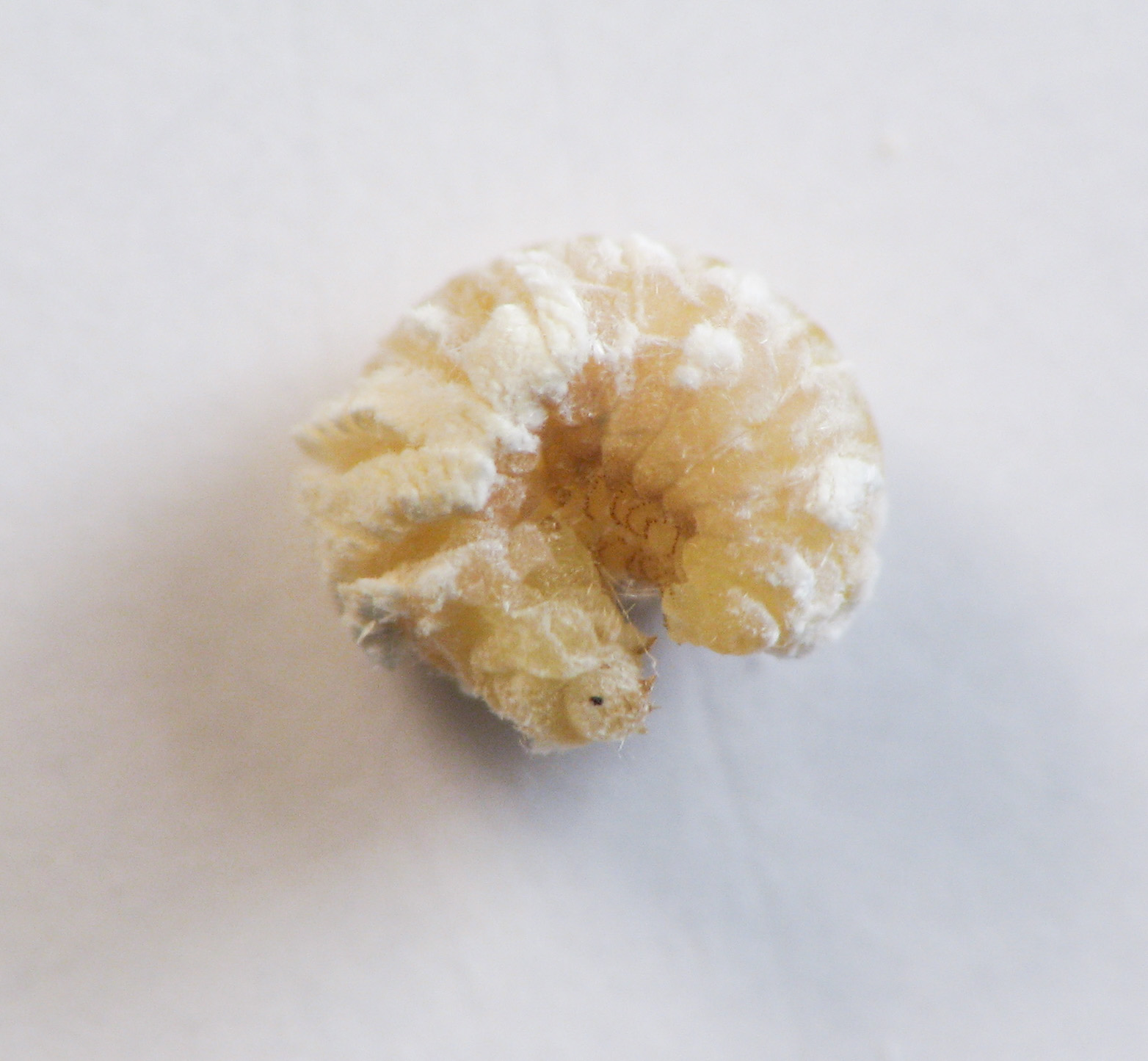
Larva
