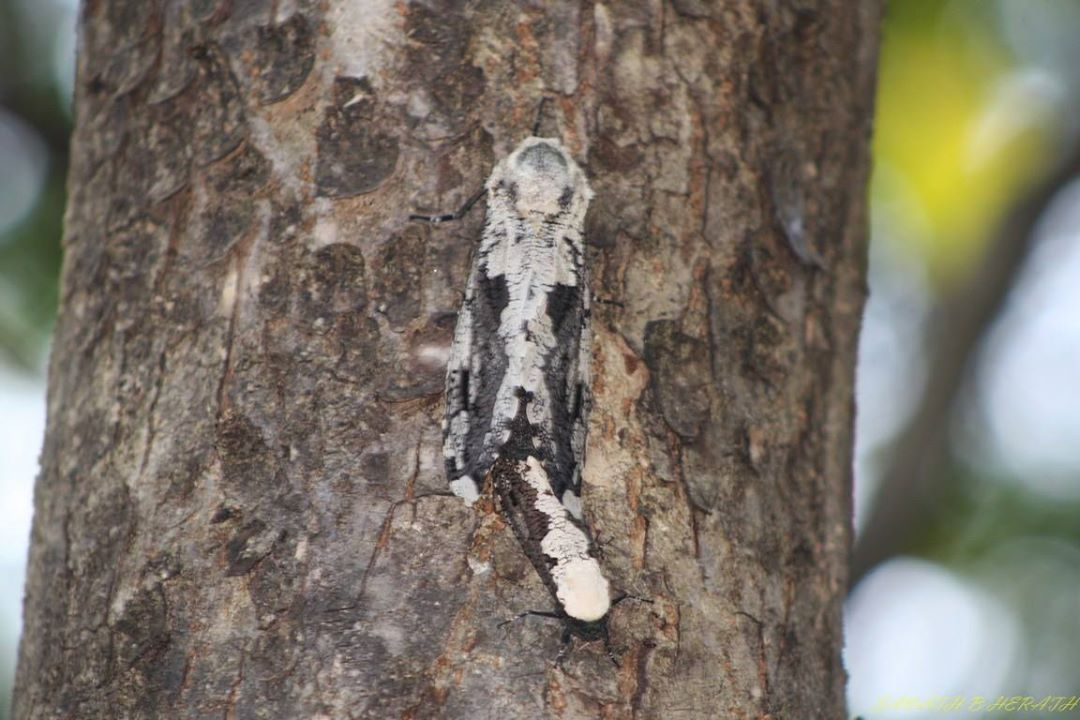
- In Sri Lanka

Scientific classification
- Domain: Eukaryota
- Kingdom: Animalia
- Phylum: Arthropoda
- Class: Insecta
- Order: Lepidoptera
- Family: Cossidae
- Genus: Xyleutes
- Species: X. persona

Binomial name
- Xyleutes persona (Le Guillou, 1841)

Synonyms
- Cossus persona Le Guillou, 1841; Xyleutes persona biakensis Roepke, 1957; Zeuzera leuconotus Walker, 1856; Xyleutes leuconotus; Duomitus leuconotus; Strigoides leucolophus Guérin-Méneville, 1844

= Xyleutes persona =

Species of moth

Xyleutes persona the Persona Wood Moth is a moth of the family Cossidae. It is found in the Indian subregion, Sri Lanka, south-east Asia, Sundaland, Sulawesi, New Guinea and Queensland. The habitat consists of lowland forests.

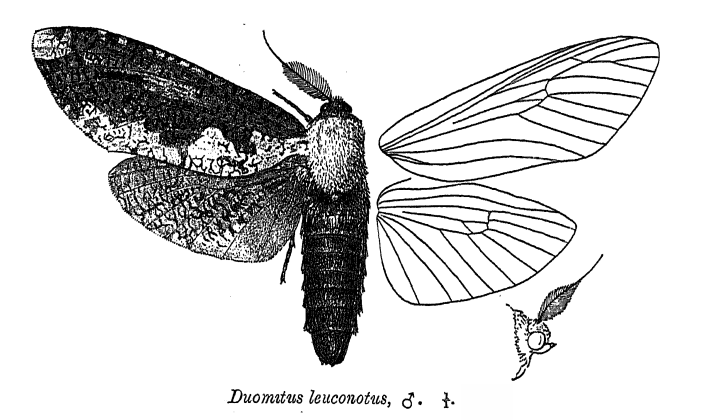
Illustration

== Description ==
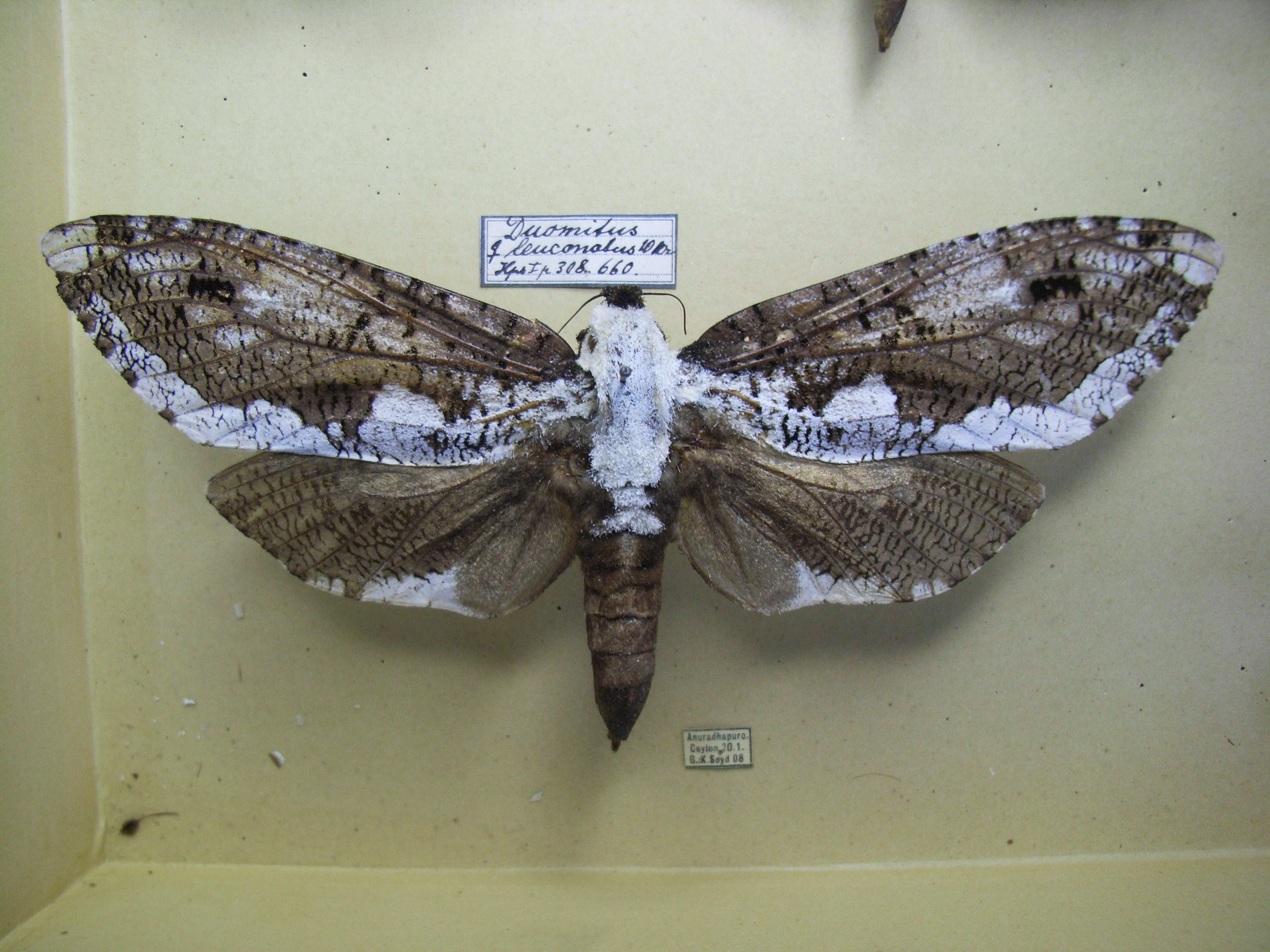
Mounted specimen

The head and abdomen of the male is black. The thorax is covered with erect white scales. The forewings are blackish. The reticulations (net-like pattern) are not so close. The inner marginal area with irregular white conjoined patches. White patches on the costa towards the apex. A black streak beyond the cell. Hindwings are blackish with black reticulations. A white patch on outer margin towards anal angle present. In the female, a large white patch sometimes developed at the center of the costa of forewing and those towards apex more developed.

Larvae bore Casuarina trees and have also been recorded feeding on Durio and Premna species.
