= Ommatissopyrops schawerdae =

Scientific classification
- Kingdom: Animalia
- Phylum: Arthropoda
- Class: Insecta
- Order: Lepidoptera
- Family: Epipyropidae
- Genus: Ommatissopyrops
- Species: O. schawerdae

Binomial name
- Ommatissopyrops schawerdae (Zerny, 1929)

Synonyms
- Epipyrops schawerdae Zerny, 1929; Heteropsyche schawerdae; Epimesophantia schawerdae; Fulgoraecia schawerdae Zerny, 1929

Species of moth

Ommatissopyrops schawerdae is a moth in the Epipyropidae family. It was described by Zerny in 1929. It is found in Spain and Israel.

The length of the forewings is about 5 mm.

The larvae have been recorded feeding on the nymphs of Hysteropterum maculipes.

== Etymology ==
The species is named for the Austrian Lepidopterist Dr. Karl Schawerda.
