= Epieurybrachys =

Scientific classification
- Kingdom: Animalia
- Phylum: Arthropoda
- Class: Insecta
- Order: Lepidoptera
- Family: Epipyropidae
- Genus: Epieurybrachys; Kato, 1940
- Species: E. eurybrachydis

Binomial name
- Epieurybrachys eurybrachydis (T. B. Fletcher, 1920)

Synonyms
- Epipyrops eurybrachydis T. B. Fletcher, 1920

Genus of moths

Epieurybrachys is a monotypic moth genus in the family Epipyropidae described by Kato in 1940. Its sole species, Epieurybrachys eurybrachydis, was described by Thomas Bainbrigge Fletcher in 1920. It is found in India.
