= Agamopsyche =

Scientific classification
- Kingdom: Animalia
- Phylum: Arthropoda
- Clade: Pancrustacea
- Class: Insecta
- Order: Lepidoptera
- Family: Epipyropidae
- Genus: Agamopsyche; Perkins, 1905
- Species: A. threnodes

Binomial name
- Agamopsyche threnodes Perkins, 1905

Synonyms
- Heteropsyche threnodes

Genus of moths

Agamopsyche is a genus of moths in the family Epipyropidae. It consists of only one species Agamopsyche threnodes, which is found in Queensland.

The wingspan is 6–8 mm. The forewings are long and narrow, deep black or blackish fuscous, generally with a purplish reflection, and with some obscure and variable small whitish spots. The hindwings are black or blackish fuscous.
