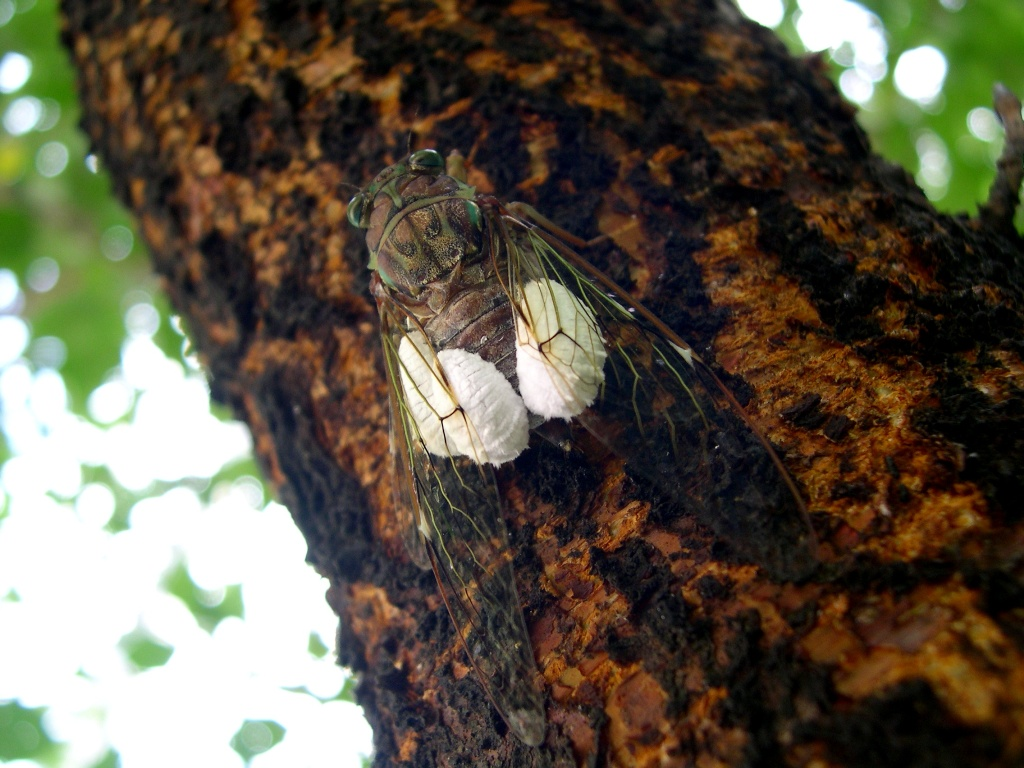
- Epipomponia nawai caterpillar on Tanna japonensis

Scientific classification
- Kingdom: Animalia
- Phylum: Arthropoda
- Class: Insecta
- Order: Lepidoptera
- Family: Epipyropidae
- Genus: Epipomponia; Dyar, 1906

= Epipomponia =

Genus of moths

Epipomponia is a genus of moths in the family Epipyropidae.

== Species ==
- Epipomponia elongata Jordan, 1928
- Epipomponia multipunctata Druce, 1887
- Epipomponia nawai Dyar, 1904
