= Palaeopsyche =

Scientific classification
- Kingdom: Animalia
- Phylum: Arthropoda
- Clade: Pancrustacea
- Class: Insecta
- Order: Lepidoptera
- Family: Epipyropidae
- Genus: Palaeopsyche; Perkins, 1905
- Species: P. melanias

Binomial name
- Palaeopsyche melanias Perkins, 1905

Genus of moths

Palaeopsyche is a genus of moths in the family Epipyropidae. It consists of only one species Palaeopsyche melanias, which is found in the wet tropics of Queensland.

The wingspan is 7-8.5 mm. The forewings are purple-tinged dull black. The hindwings are greyish tinged dark fuscous.

The larvae feed on planthoppers of the superfamily Fulgoroidea.
