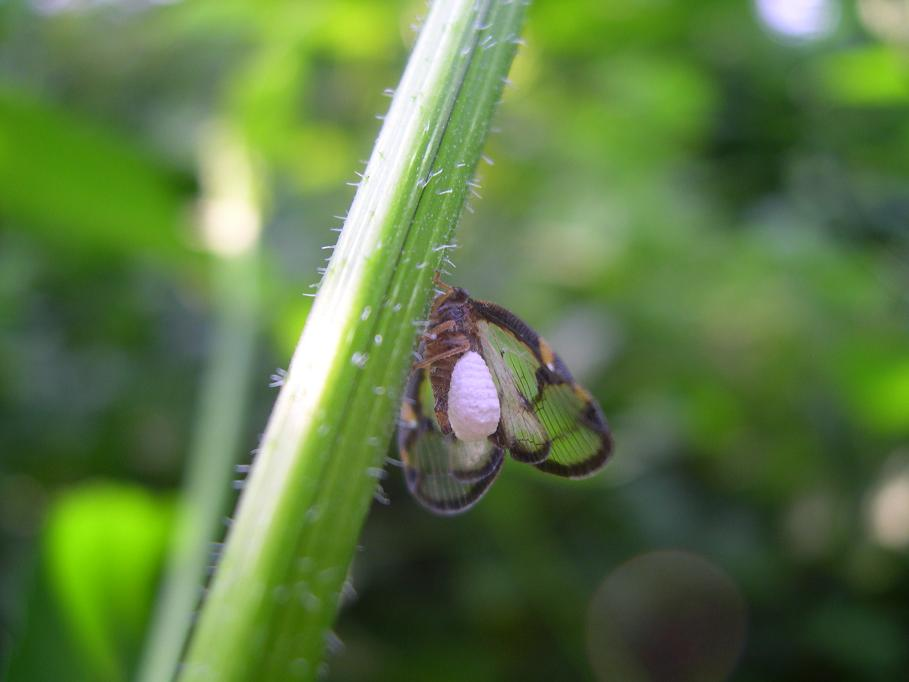
- Epiricania hagoromo on Euricania facialis

Scientific classification
- Kingdom: Animalia
- Phylum: Arthropoda
- Clade: Pancrustacea
- Class: Insecta
- Order: Lepidoptera
- Superfamily: Zygaenoidea
- Family: Epipyropidae; Dyar, 1903

= Epipyropidae =

Family of moths

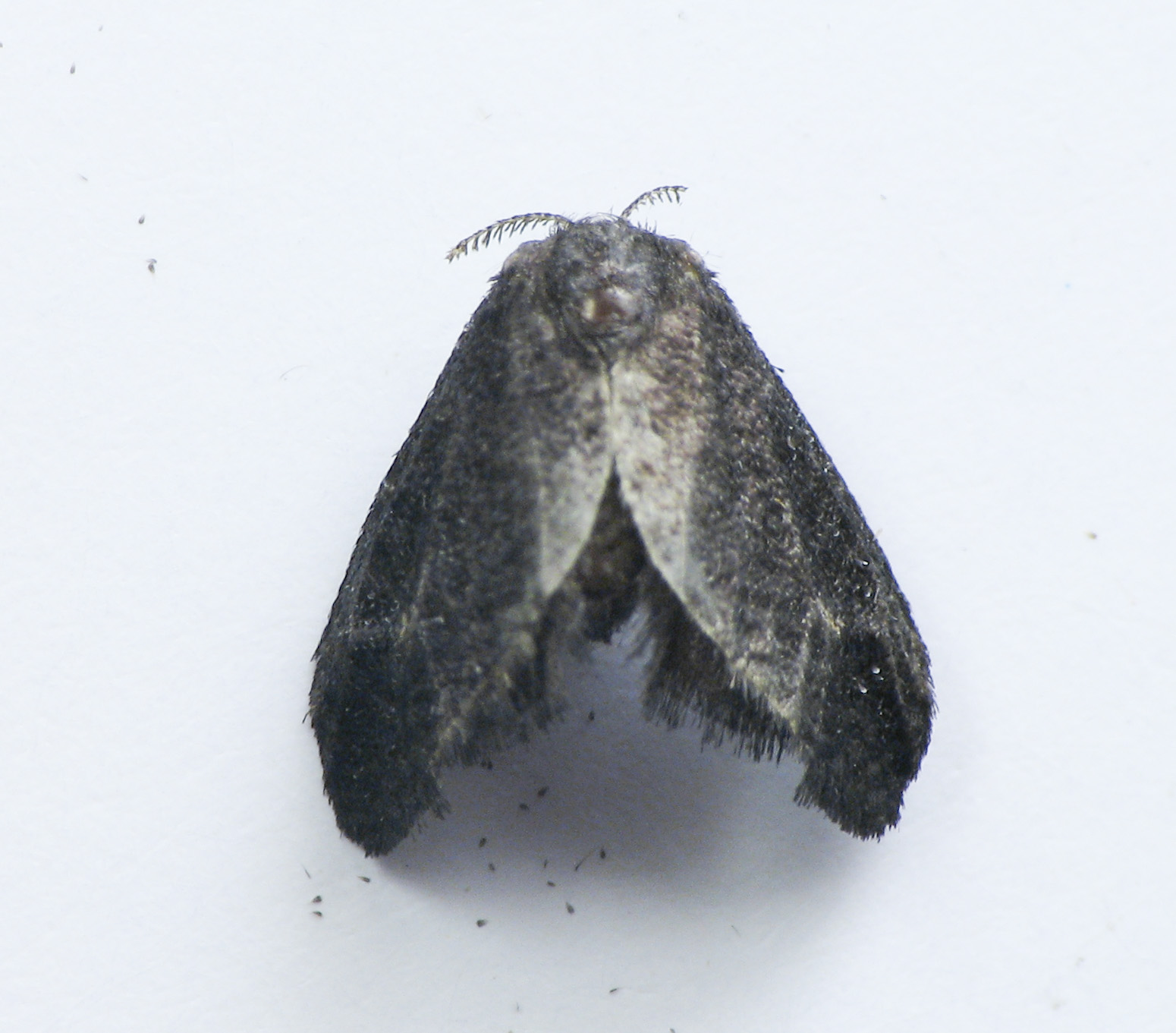
Epipyrops exigua, female

The Epipyropidae comprise a small family of moths. This family and the closely related Cyclotornidae are unique among the Lepidoptera in that the larvae are ectoparasites, the hosts typically being fulgoroid planthoppers, thus the common name planthopper parasite moths. The family undergoes hypermetamorphosis, metamorphosing from triungular first instar larvae to highly modified second instars.

== Genera ==
- Agamopsyche
- Anopyrops
- Epieurybrachys
- Epimesophantia
- Epipomponia
- Epipyrops
- Epiricania
- Heteropsyche
- Ommatissopyrops
- Palaeopsyche
- Protacraga

== Former genera ==
- Microlimax

== See also ==
- Tanna japonensis: a cicada host of Epipomponia nawai

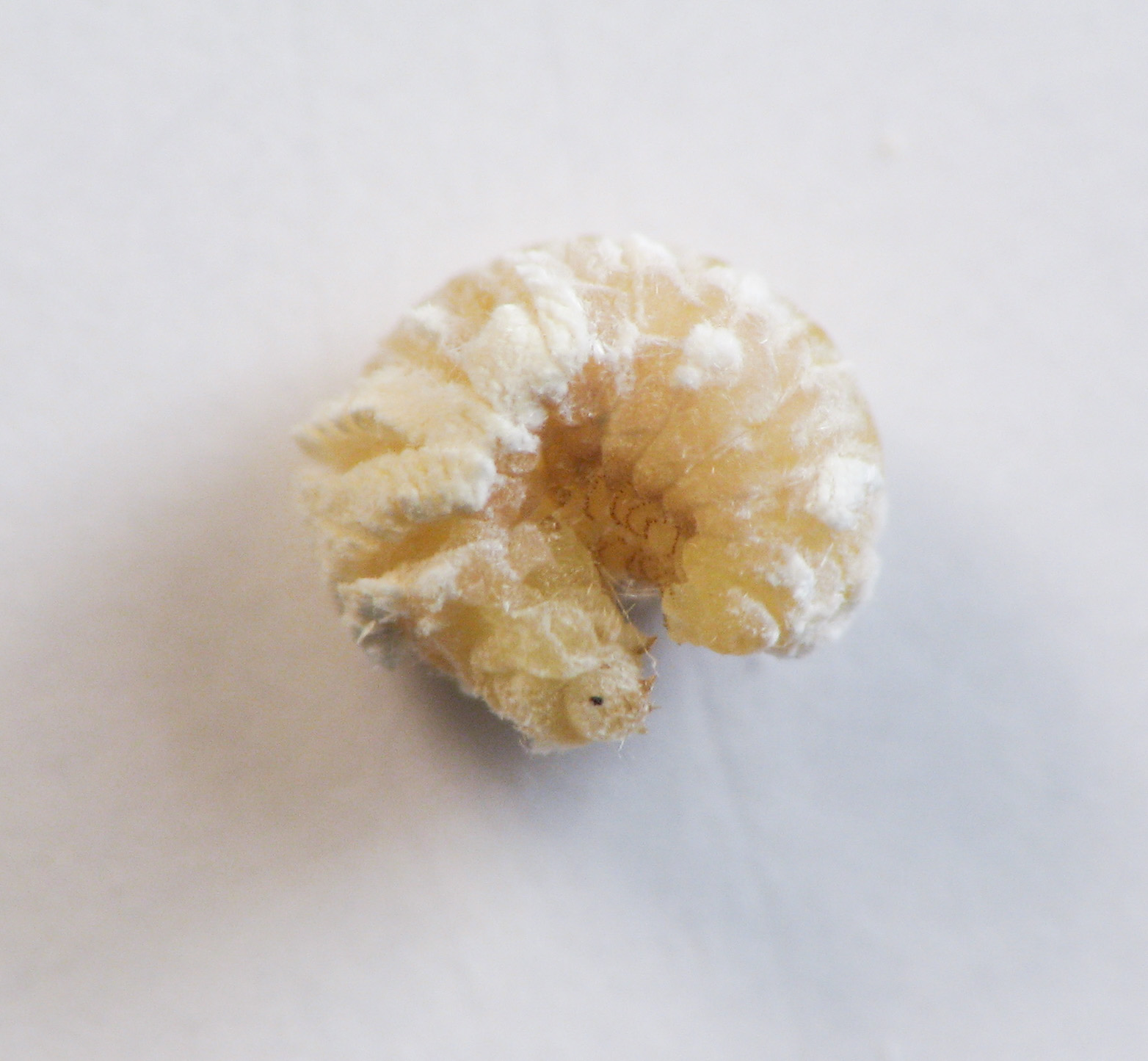
Epipyrops exigua, larva
