= Lakshmia =

Scientific classification
- Kingdom: Animalia
- Phylum: Arthropoda
- Clade: Pancrustacea
- Class: Insecta
- Order: Lepidoptera
- Family: Cossidae
- Subfamily: Zeuzerinae
- Genus: Lakshmia; Yakovlev, 2004

Moth genus in family Cossidae

Lakshmia is a genus of moths in the family Cossidae endemic to southeast Asia.

== Species ==
- Lakshmia hauensteini Yakovlev, 2004
- Lakshmia pandava Yakovlev & K. Nakao, 2013
- Lakshmia sirena Yakovlev, 2006
- Lakshmia zolotuhini Yakovlev, 2004

== Former species ==
- Lakshmia dea Yakovlev, 2006
