= Lakshmia hauensteini =

Scientific classification
- Kingdom: Animalia
- Phylum: Arthropoda
- Clade: Pancrustacea
- Class: Insecta
- Order: Lepidoptera
- Family: Cossidae
- Genus: Lakshmia
- Species: L. hauensteini

Binomial name
- Lakshmia hauensteini Yakovlev, 2004

Species of moth

Lakshmia hauensteini is a species of moth of the family Cossidae. It is found in northern Thailand.
