= Lakshmia pandava =

Scientific classification
- Domain: Eukaryota
- Kingdom: Animalia
- Phylum: Arthropoda
- Class: Insecta
- Order: Lepidoptera
- Family: Cossidae
- Genus: Lakshmia
- Species: L. pandava

Binomial name
- Lakshmia pandava Yakovlev & K. Nakao, 2013

Species of moth

Lakshmia pandava is a species of moth in the family Cossidae that lives in Thailand.
