= Lakshmia zolotuhini =

Scientific classification
- Domain: Eukaryota
- Kingdom: Animalia
- Phylum: Arthropoda
- Class: Insecta
- Order: Lepidoptera
- Family: Cossidae
- Genus: Lakshmia
- Species: L. zolotuhini

Binomial name
- Lakshmia zolotuhini Yakovlev, 2004

Species of moth

Lakshmia zolotuhini is a species of moth of the family Cossidae. It is found in Vietnam, Myanmar, India (Sikkim), Thailand and China.
