= Sansara pallidalae =

Scientific classification
- Kingdom: Animalia
- Phylum: Arthropoda
- Class: Insecta
- Order: Lepidoptera
- Family: Cossidae
- Genus: Sansara
- Species: S. pallidalae

Binomial name
- Sansara pallidalae (Hampson, 1892)

Synonyms
- Cossus pallidalae Hampson, 1892

Species of moth

Sansara pallidalae is a moth in the family Cossidae. It was described by George Hampson in 1892. It is found in Bhutan and Sikkim, India.
