= Lakshmia sirena =

Scientific classification
- Kingdom: Animalia
- Phylum: Arthropoda
- Clade: Pancrustacea
- Class: Insecta
- Order: Lepidoptera
- Family: Cossidae
- Genus: Lakshmia
- Species: L. sirena

Binomial name
- Lakshmia sirena Yakovlev, 2006

Species of moth

Lakshmia sirena is a moth in the family Cossidae. It was described by Yakovlev in 2006. It is found in Vietnam.

The length of the forewings is about 17 mm.
