= Sansara (moth) =

Scientific classification
- Kingdom: Animalia
- Phylum: Arthropoda
- Clade: Pancrustacea
- Class: Insecta
- Order: Lepidoptera
- Family: Cossidae
- Subfamily: Zeuzerinae
- Genus: Sansara; Yakovlev, 2004

Genus of moths

Sansara is a genus of moths in the family of Cossidae.

== Species ==
- Sansara dea (Yakovlev, 2006)
- Sansara hreblayi Yakovlev, 2004
- Sansara naumanni Yakovlev, 2004
- Sansara pallidalae (Hampson, 1892)
