= Sansara hreblayi =

Scientific classification
- Kingdom: Animalia
- Phylum: Arthropoda
- Clade: Pancrustacea
- Class: Insecta
- Order: Lepidoptera
- Family: Cossidae
- Genus: Sansara
- Species: S. hreblayi

Binomial name
- Sansara hreblayi Yakovlev, 2004

Species of moth

Sansara hreblayi is a moth in the family Cossidae. It was described by Yakovlev in 2004. It is found in Thailand.
