= Sansara dea =

Scientific classification
- Kingdom: Animalia
- Phylum: Arthropoda
- Clade: Pancrustacea
- Class: Insecta
- Order: Lepidoptera
- Family: Cossidae
- Genus: Sansara
- Species: S. dea

Binomial name
- Sansara dea Yakovlev, 2006

Synonyms
- Lakshmia dea Yakovlev, 2006

Species of moth

Sansara dea is a moth in the family Cossidae. It was described by Yakovlev in 2006. It is found in Nepal.

The length of the forewings is about 20 mm.
