= List of Egyptian women artists =

This is a list of women artists who were born in Egypt or whose artworks are closely associated with that country.

== A ==
- Doaa el-Adl (born 1979), cartoonist
- Aya Tarek (born 1989), Painter and Street Artist
- Inji Aflatoun (1924–1989), painter, activist
- Mariam A. Aleem (1930–2010), printed design artist
- Doa Aly (born 1976), contemporary artist
- Ghada Amer (born 1963), contemporary artist, based in New York
- Sawsan Amer (active since 1970s), artist, educator
- Heba Amin (born 1980), artist, educator
- Evelyn Ashamallah (born 1948), Coptic painter

== B ==
- Clea Badaro (1913–1968), painter
- Lara Baladi (born 1969), Egyptian-Lebanese photographer, multimedia artist

== D ==
- Dina Danish (born 1981), French-born Egyptian multimedia artist

== E ==
- Hala Elkoussy (born 1974), artist, film director
- Laila Ezzat (born 1935) painter

== F ==
- Shahira Fahmy (born 1974), architect
- Farida of Egypt (1921–1988)

== G ==
- Daria Gamsaragan (1907–1986), Egyptian-born Armenian sculptor, novelist
- Sherin Guirguis (born 1974), contemporary artist

== H ==
- Tahia Halim (1919–2003), painter
- Zeinab Abd al-Hamid (1919–2002)
- Nermine Hammam (born 1967), filmmaker, graphic designer, painter, photographer
- Amira Hanafi (born 1979), American/Egyptian poet and artist active in electronic literature
- Susan Hefuna (born 1962), German-Egyptian visual artist
- Helena of Egypt (4th century BC), painter

== I ==
- Iman Issa (born 1979), multi-disciplinary artist

== K ==
- Amal Kenawy (1974–2012), contemporary artist
- Dora Khayatt (1910–1986), Egyptian-born American painter
- Hend Kheera (born 1981), street artist

== M ==
- Maha Maamoun (born 1972), American-born Egyptian video artist and photographer, curator
- Naglaa Mahfouz (born 1959), writer, editor, artist
- Deena Mohamed (born c. 1995), graphic designer, graphic novelist, illustrator

== N ==
- Effat Nagy (1905–1994), painter
- Sabah Naim (born 1967), multimedia artist
- Margaret Nakhla (1908–1977), painter
- Fatima Naoot (born 1964)
- Amy Nimr (1898–1974), Egyptian-born artist, writer, patron of the arts

== R ==
- Khadiga Riad (1914–1981), painter, surrealist

== S ==
- Gazbia Sirry (1925–2021), painter
- Nadia Sirry (born 1958), painter

== T ==
- Aya Tarek (active since 2008), street artist

== Z ==
- Mona Zaalouk (1947–1995), painter, tapestry designer

== See also ==
- List of Egyptian artists
- List of Egyptian women photographers
