= List of Egyptian artists =

Egyptian

This is a list of notable visual artists from, or associated with, Egypt.

== A ==
- Abdel Hadi Al Gazzar, (1925–1966) painter
- Aya Tarek, (born 1989), painter and street artist
- Zeinab Abd al-Hamid, (1919–2002) painter
- Mohamed Abla (born 1953), painter
- Inji Aflatoun (1924–1989), painter
- Armen Agop (born 1969), artist
- Mariam A. Aleem (1930–2010), painter
- Doa Aly (born 1976), painter
- Ghada Amer (born 1963), artist
- Sawsan Amer (born 1937), painter
- Heba Amin (born 1980), artist
- Kamal Amin (1923–1979), graphic artist
- Evelyn Ashamallah (born 1948), Coptic painter
- Alaa Awad (born 1981), muralist, street art, painter
- Islam el Azzazi, photographer and filmmaker

== B ==
- Clea Badaro (1913–1968), painter
- George Bahgoury (born 1932), artist and caricaturist
- Lara Baladi (born 1969), Egyptian-Lebanese multimedia artist
- Bek, sculptor

== D ==
- Dina Danish (born 1981), multimedia artist
- Yehia Dessouki (born 1978), digital and mixed media artist

== E ==
- Doaa El-Adl (born 1979), cartoonist
- Gamal El-Sagini (1917–1977), sculptor
- Samir Elmesirri (born 1941), artist
- Ahmed Emad Eldin (born 1996), digital artist
- Laila Ezzat (born 1935) painter

== G ==
- Daria Gamsaragan (1907–1986), Egyptian-born Armenian sculptor, novelist
- Hussein El Gebaly (1934–2014), painter
- Habib Gorgi (1892–1965), landscape painter
- Sherin Guirguis (born 1974), contemporary artist

== H ==
- Tahia Halim (1919–2003), painter
- Nermine Hammam (born 1967), visual artist, photographer
- Fathi Hassan (born 1957), installation artist
- Hassan Mohamed Hassan (1906–1990), painter
- Susan Hefuna (born 1962), visual artist
- Adam Henein (1929–2020), sculptor
- Menhat Helmy (1925–2004), painter and printmaker
- Hassan Heshmat (1920–2006), sculptor
- Mustafa Hussein (1935–2014), painter and cartoonist

== K ==
- Amal Kenawy (1974–2012), video and performance artist
- Dora Khayatt (1910–1986), Egyptian-born American painter, watercolorist
- Hend Kheera (born 1981), street artist

== L ==
- Van Leo (1921–2002), photographer

== M ==
- Mohamed Nagy (1888–1956), painter
- Mahmoud Mokhtar (1891–1934), sculptor
- Ahmed Morsi (born 1930), poet and painter

== N ==
- Youssef Nabil (born 1972), artist and photographer
- Ahmad Nady (born 1981), comic artist and cartoonist
- Effat Nagy (1905–1994), artist
- Sabah Naim (born 1967), multimedia artist
- Margaret Nakhla (1908–1977), painter
- Moataz Nasr (born 1961), painter and sculptor

== S ==
- Senewosret-Ankh, sculptor
- Gazbia Sirry (born 1925),
- Nadia Sirry (born 1958), painter
- Sherif Sonbol (born 1956), photographer

== T ==
- Nazir Tanbouli (born 1971), mural painter
- Aya Tarek (born 1989), painter and muralist
- Arto Tchakmaktchian (1933–2019), painter and sculptor
- Thutmose, sculptor
- Diane Tuckman, silk artist

== V ==
- Dom Hubert van Zeller (1905–1984), writer and sculptor

== W ==
- Adham Wanly (1908–1959), painter
- Seif Wanly (1906–1979), painter

== Z ==
- Mona Zaalouk (1947–1995), painter, tapestry designer

== See also ==
- List of Egyptian women artists
