= List of Egyptian women photographers =

This is a list of women photographers who were born in Egypt or whose works are closely associated with that country.

== B ==
- Lara Baladi (born 1969), Egyptian-Lebanese photographer, multimedia artist

== E ==
- Laura El-Tantawy (born 1980), freelance news photographer, artistic photographer

== G ==
- Lina Geoushy (born 1990), visual artist and photographer

== H ==
- Nermine Hammam (born 1967), graphic designer, visual artist, photographer

== L ==
- Huda Lutfi (born 1948), visual artist, cultural historian

== N ==
- Rana El Nemr (born 1974), visual artist

== T ==
- Laura El-Tantawy (born 1980) British-Egyptian photographer
