= Museum of Modern Egyptian Art =

Art museum in Cairo, Egypt

Coordinates: 30.04278°N 31.2231°E

The Museum of Modern Egyptian Art
- متحف الفن المصرى الحديث
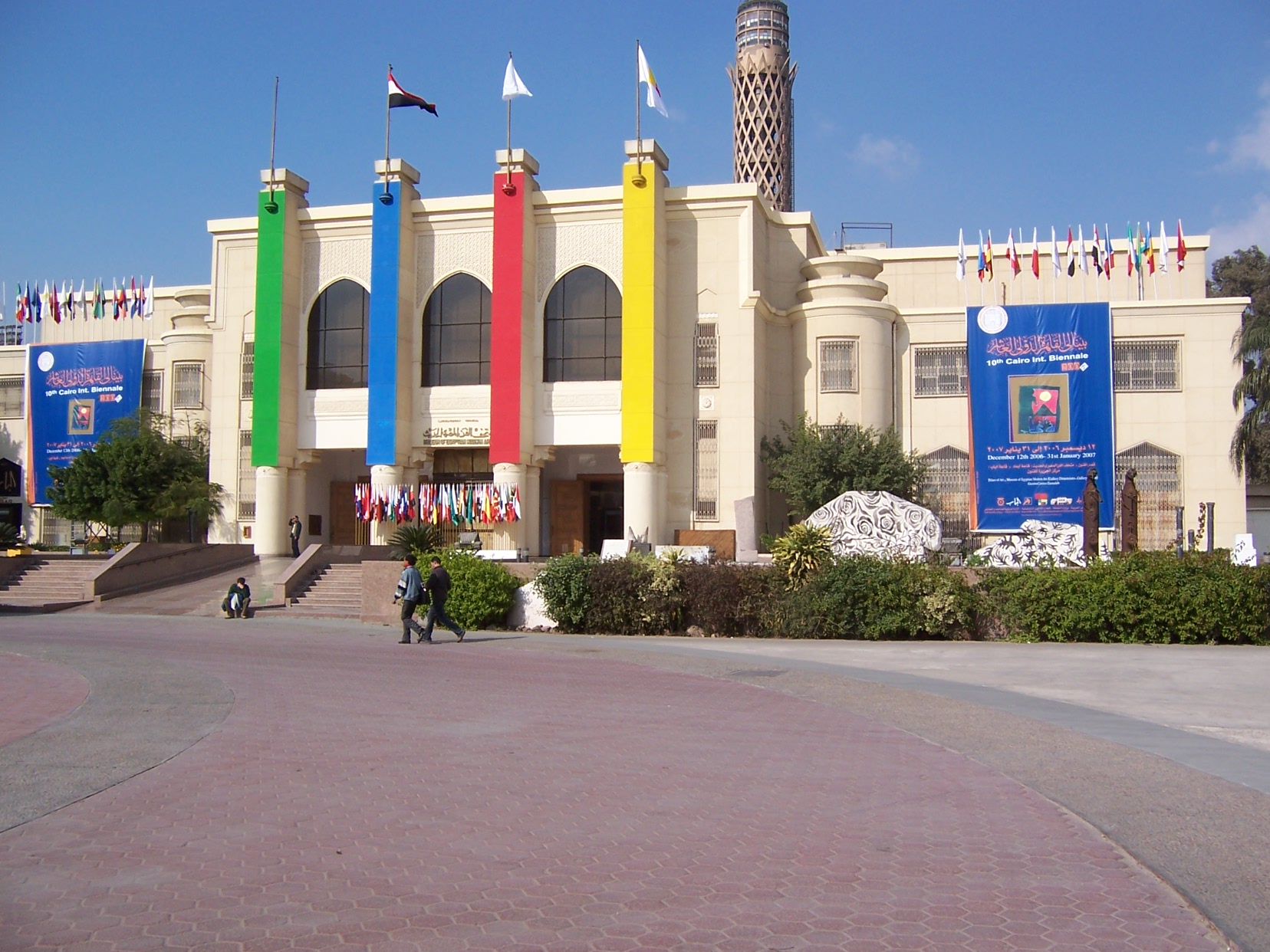
- Museum of Modern Egyptian Art, in the Zamalek district, central Cairo.
- Established: 1927
- Location: Cairo, Egypt.
- Type: art museum
- Collections: The museum holds paintings and sculptures that show the development of the Egyptian art movement from the early 20th century pioneers through contemporary artists' works.
- Collection size: 13,000
- Owner: Ministry of Culture

The Museum of Modern Egyptian Art, is Cairo, Egypt's main modern art museum holding collections of early 20th Century contemporary art pioneers, including Mahmoud Said, Ragheb Ayad, Gazbeya Sirry, and Abdel Hadi Al-Gazzar, among others. It was inaugurated in 1927 and is part of the National Cultural Centre in the former fair grounds of Zamalek.

== Collections ==
The museum holds more than 13,000 paintings and sculptures that show the development of the Egyptian art movement from the early 20th century pioneers through contemporary artists' works. There is are permanent and temporary exhibits of works by renowned Egyptian artists, such as:

- Ahmad Sabri
- Mahmoud Sa'id
- Laila Ezzat
- Ragheb Ayad
- Mohammed Naghi
- Gazbia Sirry
- Inji Aflatoun
- Tahia Halim
- Abdel Hadi Al-Gazzar
- Ahmed Morsi
- Ibrahim Mohammed Khalil
- Georges Al-Sabbagh
- George Bahgoury
- Salah Abdel-Karim
- Adam Henein
- Abdel-Badie Abdel-Hay
- Mahmoud Moussa
- Hamed Abdallah

== See also ==
- El Sawy Culture Wheel
- Museum of Islamic Ceramics
- List of Egyptian artists
- List of Egyptian women artists

Note:

- The similarly named but separate modern art institution, the Museum of Modern Art in Egypt, is in Port Said, Egypt, near the confluence of the Suez Canal and the Mediterranean.
