= Laila Ezzat =

Egyptian painter (born 1935)

- Born: Laila Mohamed Ezzat; 1935 (age 89–90); Cairo, Egypt
- Other names: Leila Ezzat
- Occupation: Painter
- Years active: 1950s–now

Laila Ezzat (Arabic: ليلى عزت, romanized: Laïla Ezzat; born 1935) is an Egyptian painter. She has exhibited both nationally and internationally.

Ezzat is primarily a self-taught painter. In the 1950s, Ezzat was mentored by Egyptian–Armenian painter Ashot Zorian. In her early career she focused on paintings of animals (particularly horses), followed by work as an expressionist and later an abstract artist.

Ezzat's artwork can be found in museum collections, including at the Museum of Modern Egyptian Art in Cairo.

== See also ==
- List of Egyptian artists
