= Islam el Azzazi =

Egyptian film director and photographer

- Born: 1971
- Citizenship: Egypt
- Occupations: Photographer, Film director

Islam el Azzazi is a still photographer, graphic designer, and filmmaker who is based in Cairo, Egypt.

== Career ==
He has worked at El-Warsha Theatre Company where he worked on coaching actors as well working on the photography and filming of theatrical productions.

He is a founding member of the independent film production group "SEMAT" via which he had the opportunity to be responsible for two film making workshops in Alexandria in cooperation with the Jesuit Cultural Center there. Those workshops resulted in releasing 16 short films and 17 new filmmakers.

In 2007 he established a new production company “WIKA” with three other filmmakers.

== Filmography ==
- 1992 March (Writer, Director), 35mm, 3 min.
- 1993 Al-Kharaz (The Beads) (Writer, Director), based on (The Idiot) of Dostoevsky, 35mm, 18 min.
- 1994 Madina Yaskonoha Al-Zil (A City Inhabited by Shadows), a documentary on Siwa Oasis, in conjunction with the poet Alaa Khaled, (Producer, Editor, D.O.P and Director), VHS, 20 min.
- 2001 Wegouh Al-Fayoum (Fayuom Portraits), A Documentary on the Fayoum ancient funerary portraits, (Writer, Director), Digital Beta, 24 min.
- 2003 Et Hakkem Fe'naik (Dominate your Eyes), A Documentary on Berlin, (Producer, Editor, D.O.P and Director), DVcam, 45 min.
- 2006 Nahar we Leil (Day and Night), (Writer, Director), DVcam, 34 min.
- 2011 "Friday of Rage" من الذاكرة الشعورية, A short documentary
- 2012 "A Working Copy" نسخة عمل, experimental 16mm with sound, Color and B&W

Vimeo link https://vimeo.com/user6532019

== Awards ==
- Best Documentary (El Sawi Documentary Festival – Cairo 2006) for Dominate you Eyes
- Best Actor, Bassem Samra & Best Production (2emes Rencontres De L’Image – Cairo 2006) for Nahar we Leil
- Best production (2emes Rencontres De L’Image – Cairo 2006 ) for Nahar we Leil
- Best Film (Sawi Short Film Festival - Cairo 2007) for Nahar we Leil

== Festivals ==
- The 2nd EU Film Festival - Cairo 2006
- Caravan - Cairo 2006
- 2emes Rencontres De L’Image – Cairo 2006
- Rotterdam Arab film festival 2006 - official selection
- FIPA film festival 2006 - official selection
- El Sawi Short Film Festival - Cairo 2007
- National Festival for Egyptian Cinema 2007
- CinemaEast Film Festival – New York 2007
- 11th Annual Arab Film Festival 2007 (San Francisco - Los Angeles)

== TV Screenings ==
- O TV
- Al Sharjah TV
