= Naglaa Mahfouz =

Egyptian writer and artist (born 1959)

- Citizenship: Egypt
- Education: Cairo University
- Occupation: Journalist

Naglaa (or Nijla, or Nagla) Mahfouz (born 1959) is an Egyptian writer, editor and artist.

Mahfoud is deputy editor-in-chief of Al-Ahram newspaper.

== Early life ==
Nijla Mahfouz was born in 1959 in Cairo, Egypt. She obtained a bachelor's degree in mass communication from the faculty of mass communication at Cairo University in 1979.

== Career ==
=== Writer ===
Mahfouz is a writer and the deputy managing editor of Al-Ahram newspaper. Previously, she worked for various media organisations, including preparing and presenting radio programs on IslamOnline, including the Make Your Success with Naglaa Mahfouz and Win the Religion and the World programs.

In addition to her weekly writings on human development on the "Bus and Tal" website, under the title "Enjoy your success", as well as her writings in the field of family relations. Mahfouz works in the field of social counselling in the "Egyptian Youth Magazine" and the "Bus and Tal" website, a field in which she previously worked in the "Egyptian Saudi Group for Telephone Consultations and Information Technology", "IslamOnline" and "The Nation's Website".

Najla has published over 48 books on topics including humanitarian, social issues, and human development. She has also written more than 56 children's books.

=== Fine art ===
Mahfouz is plastics artist and a member of both the “Cairo Atelier” and the “Asala Association for Contemporary Heritage Arts.” She has held six art exhibitions, showing her oil painting, ceramics and sculpture, including private exhibitions and group exhibitions such as “The Giving Exhibition in the Arts Complex” in 1992, in addition to international group exhibitions such as the exhibition entitled “Only the Light is Richer” which was held at the British University in June year 2010. Her solo shows have included the Shomoua gallery (1995), the Cairo Atelier (1995) and at Al-Ahram (1999).

== Selected works ==
Among her books:

- "Make your inner light", self-development.
- “Escape” is a collection of short stories.
- um papers for women only.
- Very special.
- Secrets of success and happiness.
- Young confessions.
- Women's Confessions.
- Confessions of men.
- «Adventures of the Queens of Dreams» stories for children.
