= Evelyn Ashamallah =

Egyptian artist (born 1948)

- إيفيلين عشم الله
- Born: 1948 (age 77–78); Desouk, Kafr el-Sheikh Governorate, Egypt
- Education: B.F.A., Faculty of Fine Arts, Alexandria University (1973)
- Occupations: Painter; curator; art administrator; journalist
- Years active: 1970s–present
- Known for: Surreal, imaginative storytelling paintings with vibrant colors and distorted figures
- Style: Egyptian-styled surrealism; abstract portraits; magical folk narrative imagery
- Spouse: Mahmoud Yousry
- Children: Two sons (Bassem Yousry, Salam Yousry)
- Parent(s): Ashamallah Eskandar Hanna (father), Elaine Mikhail Hanna (mother)
- Awards: Various national and international recognitions (e.g. mother’s day competition, Egypt Opera House competition, international Faust Prize)

Evelyn Ashamallah (Arabic: إيفيلين عشم الله) is an Egyptian contemporary artist, best known for her vibrant and surrealistic works. Born to a Coptic Christian family in Desouk, Kafr el-Sheikh, Egypt in 1948 to Ashamallah Eskandar Hanna and Elaine Mikhail Hanna. Evelyn Ashamallah married an Egyptian Journalist, Mahmoud Yousry and they have two sons, Bassem Yoursi and Salam Yoursi. Evelyn Ashamallah also has three brothers. Evelyn Ashamallah is part of the 1970s Egyptian generation which was prompted after the defeat in the Arab-Israeli War of 1967 to adopt a different trend from the realistic art that dominated Egyptian visual art in the 1960s. In the 1980s she moved to Algeria for a few years.

Evelyn Ashamallah art was influenced by Abdel Hadi el-Gazzar and Hamed Nada, who both produced folk fantasy paintings with an Egyptian-styled surrealist touch. Initially, Evelyn began drawing with pencil but over time she developed her style. Ashmallah's artistic approach has moved from natural landscapes to abstract portraits and plants. She has used various media, including oil, wax, and acrylic. Ashamallah's style is now known for its playfulness, and the evoking of magic fictitious legend where each painting tells a story. Evelyn Ashamallah's work usually have great vibrant colors schemes and unrealistic proportions. Ashamallah has a fluid and adaptive approach when making her art pieces.

Ashamallah has been featured in many exhibition locally and internationally throughout her career. Receiving many awards and honors due to her works globally.

== Education ==
In 1973 she graduated from the Faculty of Fine Arts at Alexandria University.

== Careers ==
Evelyn Ashamallah worked as General Authority of Cultural Palaces as a professional artist. From 1973 to 1975, she worked as a writer for Rose al-Yūsuf magazine. Ashamallah was also part of Fine Arts Administration of the Republican Cultural Authority. From 1993 to 1995, Ashamallah was Director of Mohammed Nagy Museum. From 2000 to 2002, she was Director of Egypt Modern Art Museum.

== Artworks ==
Evelyn Ashamallah's art pieces are narrative, vibrant and playful. In some pieces, Evelyn Ashamallah takes memories of her life and incorporates them into the piece.

Mother Genie is wax colors on paper, 70 x 50 cm, made in 1987. The piece depicts two figures with unrealistic aspects and proportions, one is pink with two horn standing on a rock, twisting their body with hands in the air. The second figure is green with smaller horns, sitting on the floor looking at their hands. The emotion on both figures contrasting each other, the pink seeming happy while the green seems sad and in deep thought. The piece also has a lizard in a magenta tone facing north, while another, smaller, pink lizard is on top of the bigger lizard, facing south. The background consists of many earthy tones. The piece seemingly tells the story of one figure trying to cheer up or gain the attention of the other.

The King and The Servant is an acrylic on paper, 70 x 50 cm, made in 1988. The artwork consists of two figures, the first being a tan, big proportioned head and body with skinny legs wearing a necklace that is a small human shape, sitting on a blue unique throne and holding a large flower in one hand while the other is out-stretched to the second figure. The second figure is an orange, smaller, and thinner figure sitting on the floor, showing the back of the figure and the head tilted up towards the other figures hand. The background consists of cool toned blues and greens. The storytelling of the image shows a king seemingly being worshipped by the servant.

A Child Playing is gouache on paper, 15 x 10 cm, made in 1998. This piece depicts a large, orange, child-like figure. the figure is showing the back of its body but the front of the face. The face of the figure is a big pair of green lips only and the rest of the face is cut off. The figure is playing with a yoyo and is taking a long stride that is across the paper. The background contains yellows and blues. The artwork, like its title, is clearly depicting a surrealistic scene of a child playing

== Exhibitions ==
=== Solo exhibitions ===
— Exhibition at Cairo Atelier 1985–1976–1987.

— Exhibition in the Round Hall of the Syndicate of Fine Artists 1989.

— Exhibition in Akhenaten Gallery, Arts Complex, Zamalek, 1993, 1998.

— Exhibition in Fort, Nuremberg, Germany, 1999.

— Exhibition at Tanta Culture Palace, 2002.

— Retrospective exhibition in Ebdaa Hall- Cairo, 2003.

— Exhibition at Al-Anfoushi Culture Palace — Alexandria, 2004.

— "20 Years of Evelyn Ashamallah" at 6 Contemporary Arts, Zamalek, Cairo 2013

— Exhibition in Khan Al-Maghrabi Gallery, Zamalek, October 2017.

— Exhibition entitled (The Unspeakable Words) at (Axis) Gallery in Downtown, November 2021.

=== Group exhibitions ===
==== Local ====
— Bilateral exhibition in Desouk city, 1971–1978.

—Egyptian Women’s Creations Exhibition (the centenary of the departure of Ali Mubarak), the Supreme Council of Culture 1994.

— An exhibition at the Faculty of Mass Communication, Cairo University, in celebration of International Women’s Day 1996.

— Exhibition honoring the exhibiting artists in the Round Hall during the period 2003–2006 at the Round Hall May 31, 2006.

— Exhibition (Artists between Dream and Reality Space) at Dai Art Gallery, April 2019.

==== International ====
— Exhibitions in Algeria from 1979 to 1982.

— An exhibition of Egyptian women artists at the Egyptian Academy in Rome 1992.

— An exhibition of Arab women artists (with the participation of ten Egyptian artists) at the Arab Women Organization, and he toured all states, the United States of America from 1992 to 1994.

— Exhibition (Creative Women of the Mediterranean and Black Seas) Thessaloniki, Greece 2000.

— The Fifth Burullus International Forum for Painting on Walls and Boats, Kafr El-Sheikh, October 2018.

== Honors and awards ==
— First prize for the Mother’s Day competition at the Ministry of Mass Culture, 1985.

— The Photography Award — the Grand Competition for the decoration of the Egyptian Opera House, 1989.

— Appreciation Award in the 1st Youth Salon 1989.

— Faust International Prize from the International Faust Society, Germany, 1992.

== Achievements ==
Member of Cairo Atelier Group of Artists and Writers.

Founding member of the Syndicate of Fine Artists.

Member of the Fine Arts Alumni Association.

Nominated for the AICA workshop in Egypt 1997.

== Publications ==
Evelyn Ashamallah was part of the book Translating Dissent: Voices From and With the Egyptian Revolution by Mona Baker

Evelyn Ashamallah's artwork was the cover of the book Cultural Criticism in Egyptian Women's Writing by Caroline Seymour-Jorn

Evelyn Ashamallah's work was also in the book Anthology Mediterranean Waves edited by Ashraf Aboul-Yazid.

Ashamallah has edited two essays about critic Kamal Gweily and Naeem Attya, in commemoration session of the Egyptian critics and artists by the Fine Arts Committee of the Supreme Council of Culture.

== See also ==
- List of prominent Copts
