= Sabah Naim =

Egyptian multimedia artist

- Born: 1967 (age 58–59); Cairo, Egypt
- Education: The College of Art Education, Cairo

Sabah Naim (born 1967) is a contemporary Egyptian multimedia artist. Her work focuses on documenting people and scenes in Cairo, Egypt, and incorporates street photography, painting, collage, embroidery, and video art.

== Biography ==
Naim received a bachelor of fine arts (1990), master of fine arts (1996), and PhD in contemporary art (2003) from the College of Art Education, Cairo, where she was a student of Mohammed Abla. She was the first person in her family to receive an advanced degree, and used proceeds from sales of her art to support her parents and brothers. Naim has served on the faculty of art education at both Helwan University and her alma mater.

== Process and work ==
Taking inspiration from the anonymous environment of Cairo's busy streets, Naim's primary artistic process begins with photographing or filming people in public settings. She typically enlarges these figures to life-size or greater when printing her work in black-and-white on paper or canvas. Installed in a gallery setting, Naim's decontextualized portraits may also suggest reconfigured street scenes for the viewer to navigate. These photographic prints are sometimes hand-colored, collaged with rolled-up newspapers, or adorned with hand-painted motifs of circles, dots, arabesques, and other symbols. In addition, Naim has exhibited both drawings and paintings entirely composed of repeating shapes and colors, with a focus on naturalistic forms like flowers, stars, and trees. The repetitiveness of these common symbols in her work, which are found in both modern and traditional artistic traditions around the world, is meant to highlight shared experiences in the human condition. Furthermore, critics have noted that Naim's work reflects themes of modernization and globalization in urban Egypt, as well as raises questions about cultural binaries, such as masculine and feminine, contemporary and traditional, religious and secular, and fine arts and handicrafts.

== Exhibitions ==
Naim has exhibited internationally, including the fiftieth Venice Biennale (2003), the Havana Biennial (2003); and the touring exhibition Africa Remix: Contemporary Art of a Continent (2004). Her works are also located in the permanent collections of the British Museum in London as well as the Egyptian Ministry of Culture and in the Museum of Modern Egyptian Art, both in Cairo.

=== Solo exhibitions ===
- B21 Gallery Dubai 2008
- Lia Rumma Gallery, Naples, Italy 2007
- Karin Francis, Cairo, Egypt 2006
- Cairo Atelier, Cairo, Egypt. 2004
- Lia Rumma Gallery, Milan, Italy. 2004
- 8th Havana Biennial, Havana, Cuba 2003
- Part of Cairo Modern Art in Holland Circus theater, The Hague, Holland. 2001
- The Institute, Cairo, Egypt. 2001
- Gezira Arts Center, Cairo, Egypt 2000
- Townhouse Gallery, Cairo, Egypt 2000
- Cairo Atelier, Cairo, Egypt 1998

=== Group exhibitions ===
- Histories of Now: Six Artists from Cairo 2014 Colby College Museum of Art, (anniversary of the first protests in (Tahrir Square)
- Art Basel Miami Beach 2009 Art Basel
- Word into Art: Artists of the Modern Middle East 2006 The British Museum
- 50th International Venice Biennale 2003 The Venice Biennale
