= Daria Gamsaragan =

Egyptian-born Armenian visual artist (1907–1986)

- Դարուհի Կամսարական
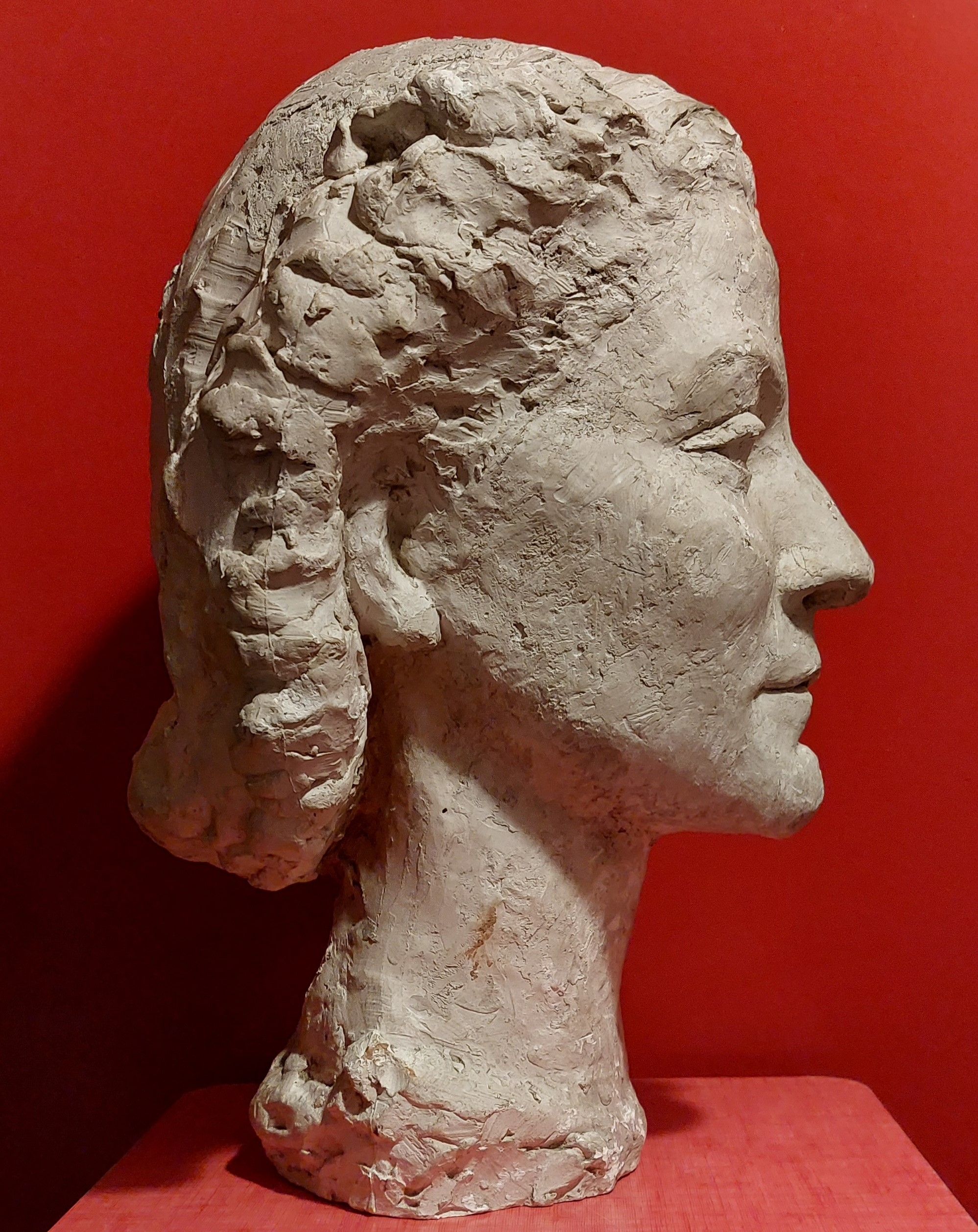
- Self-portrait of Daria Gamsaragan, plaster
- Born: 24 April 1907; Alexandria, Egypt
- Died: 1 March 1986 (aged 78); Paris, France
- Other names: Anne Sarag, Anna Sarag, Daria Kamsarakan, Taria Gamsaragan, Daruhi Gamsaragan
- Citizenship: Egypt (1907–), France (1967–)
- Education: Académie de la Grande Chaumière
- Occupations: Visual artist, writer
- Known for: Sculptor, medallist, jewelry designer
- Spouse: Imre Gyomai (m. 1926–1939; separated)
- Partner: Georges E. Vallois (1939–1945)
- Relatives: Tigran Kamsarakan (uncle)

Daria Gamsaragan (1907–1986; Armenian: Դարուհի Կամսարական) was an Egyptian-born Armenian visual artist and writer, known for her work as a sculptor of miniature objects and medalist. She worked for jewelers and fashion houses in the 1970s. Gamsaragan used the pseudonym of Anne Sarag for her writings.

== Early life, family, and education ==
Daria Gamsaragan was born on 24 April 1907, in Alexandria, Egypt, to wealthy parents of Armenian heritage from Constantinople. Her father Armenak Bey Gamsaragan and the paternal side of the family had been in the tobacco business for multiple generations. Her uncle was writer Tigran Kamsarakan (1866–1941). She grew up speaking Arabic, Armenian, French, and Turkish. Gamsaragan graduated from the private high school Lycée Français d'Alexandrie in 1924.

She attended art class at the Académie de la Grande Chaumière in Paris, and studied under Antoine Bourdelle, Joseph Csaky, and Jean-Joseph Benjamin-Constant.

== Career ==
In 1966, Gamsaragan created a monument for the burial of Armenian intellectuals at the Cimetière parisien de Bagneux, a cemetery in Bagneux. From 1967 to 1982, she worked for the Monnaie de Paris (the mint) and created around fifteen medals to commemorate noted figures.

In the early 1970s, Gamsaragan worked on two projects related to jewelry. She designed twelve signs of the Zodiac for the luxury goods company Cartier; and designed crosses as jewelry for the fashion house Chanel.

The weekly French-Armenian newspaper "Armenia" featured Gamsaragan's sculpture piece "Crucified" on the cover of their April 1977 issue, in commemoration of the Armenian genocide (1915–1917). In 1984, a retrospective of her work was exhibited at the Galerie Sculptures, rue Visconti in Paris.

Gamsaragan died on 1 March 1986, in her home in Paris. Her artwork can be found in museum collections, include at the Alexandria Museum of Fine Arts; the Musée d'Art Moderne de Paris; the Musée des Beaux-Arts de Caen; and the Museum of Modern Egyptian Art.

== Personal life ==
Gamsaragan married Hungarian journalist Imre Gyomai in 1926 in Alexandria, and they settled down to live together in Paris for the next ten years.

By 1939, she and her husband Gyomai separated, and she started dating Georges E. Vallois, a newspaper editor and journalist with Libération newspaper. After the war ended in 1945, Gamsaragan and Vallois separated.

In 1967, she became a French national.

== Publications ==
- Sarag, Anne (1957). Voyage Avec Une Ombre [Journey with a Shadow] (in French). Calmann-Lévy, réédition numérique FeniXX. ISBN 9782706200908.
- Sarag, Anne (1965). L'Anneau de Feu: Roman [Ring of Fire] (in French). Paris: Les Éditeurs Français Réunis. ISBN 9782402550703.
