= Amal Kenawy =

Egyptian visual artist (1974–2012)

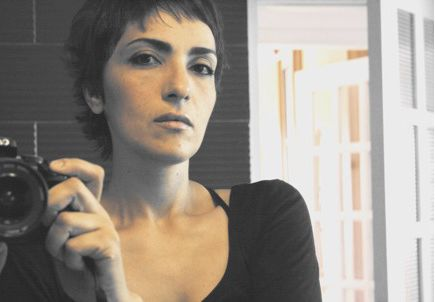
- Photograph of Amal Kenawy
- Born: 1974; Cairo
- Died: 19 August 2012 (aged 37–38)
- Website: amal-kenawy.com

Amal Kenawy (1974–19 August 2012) was an Egyptian contemporary visual artist, best known for her videos, performance and feminist work. Active since 1998, her successful career helped her gain international recognition.

== Biography ==
Amal Kenawy was born in 1974 in Cairo, Egypt. She showed an interest in film, art and fashion design from an early age. In her childhood, Amal used to make her own clothes from any fabric she could find. Her parents struggled financially and Amal was the youngest of four children.

Her artistic studies began at the Egypt Cinema Institute. In 1999 she received her undergraduate degree in painting, from the Faculty of Fine Arts at Helwan University.

She started her artistic career as a student, collaborating with her older brother, Abdel Ghany Kenawy. Their collaboration resulted in a large number of artworks ranging from sculptures, compositions and videos. Their work gained several awards and international recognition, including UNESCO's Grand Prize at the International Cairo Biennale.

Amal married Shady Elnoshokaty, a contemporary artist who helped her at the beginning of her career. After they divorced Amal lived with her son, Yassin.

Her solo work drew upon a more intimate approach. She used her own body alongside representations of fragile materials, animals and objects, to express mental and physical pain and address themes such as birth, marriage, death, dreams and memory.

Amal Kenawy died on August 19, 2012, at the age of 38 after a long battle with leukemia. Her work is still exhibited in many museums and institutions around the world. She is remembered as one of the most inspirational feminist artists in the Middle East. She was an iconic female artist, respected for her creativity and deep devotion to her work, though tragically short-lived.

Her work is collected by major public collection, such as Mathaf: Arab Museum of Modern Art in Qatar and the Sharjah Art Foundation in the UAE, and exhibited in major biennials such as Dakar Biennale and Sharjah Biennial.

== Notable works ==
- 2002 Frozen Memory, video, photograph and sculpture composition
- 2004 The Room, performance
- 2004 The Journey, video performance and wax sculpture featuring Amal wearing a white dress and floating above the floor of the room in which she is confined, only to later drop heavily on her feet to resume twirling and floating again
- 2006 You Will Be Killed, video animation and paintings
- 2006 Booby-Trapped Heaven, video and photography
- 2007 Non Stop Conversation, video and performance
- 2009 The Silence of Lambs AKA The Silence of Sheep, public performance

== The Room (2004) ==
The Room (2004) is a single-channel video and simultaneous live-action performance that was exhibited at Darat al Funun: The Khalid Shoman Exhibition in Amman, Jordan. The video, lasting approximately ten minutes in duration, entails several scenes with bridal-themed imagery. These include a scene with a woman hanging from a tree wearing the structure of an old-fashioned gown, a bride laying amongst wool and candles in a bed, and the lace-gloved hands of a woman whose face is concealed shown slowly sewing ornaments to a beating anatomical heart. On a small platform stage alongside the video, Kenawy embarks on the process of stitching a white dress on a mannequin that she eventually lights on fire and lets burn to nothing. This creates a glowing spectacle at the end of the performance in the dark room where it takes place.

Kenawy intended for these digital and physical wedding motifs to serve as metaphors that symbolize the role of gender and marriage in the Islamic society, as well as the impact that these socio-cultural structures have on the individual. In conceptualizing this artwork, Kenawy drew from her dreams, memories, and lived realities to construct an idea of what defines an individual's truest self. In doing this, she contrasts the goals of her various other artworks that aim to reflect universal human experiences rather than exemplifying her own personal traumas and feelings.

The imagery of the beating heart being stitched with ornaments is one of the longest shown during the performance. By contrasting the stagnant accessories being stitched with the moving anatomical heart, the imagery is specifically meant to reflect the rigidity of marriage compared to the mobility of the human being. The title of this performance was intended to further emphasize this concept of interconnectivity as it ties to Kenawy's belief that there is an internal, metaphorical "room" bounding the physical human body that is separate from our surroundings: the external "room". The visuals in this performance were also meant to draw from the ways the human body influences its surroundings as well as how external context shapes the individual; a theme central to several of Kenawy's works including You Will Be Killed (2006) and Booby-Trapped Heaven (2006).

This theme is often extrapolated upon by critics and educational professionals who claim that her works reflect the larger patriarchal context that Kenawy operated within in Cairo: implying many of her performances have feminist goals. In her online interview with Gerald Matt, a professor at the University of Applied Arts in Vienna, Kenawy clarifies that this piece, along with many of her other works, is not intended to be feminist propaganda. She does however acknowledge the crucial role that gender plays in the majority of her performances and displays and denotes that her work is meant to explore humanity and emotion in all realms, including that of gender inequality.

== The Silence of Lambs (2009) ==
The Silence of Lambs (2009) was one of Amal Kenawy's most highly debated works by both scholars and the Egyptian peoples. Commissioned by Townhouse Gallery as part of their "Assume the Position" exhibition (December 13, 2009 to January 17, 2010), the performance took place in the streets of Cairo where several Egyptian men were paid to crawl out of a building, cross a busy intersection during rush hour at Champollion Road and Mahmoud Bassiouny Street, and then continue down Champollion Road. These crawling day labourers represented lambs, while Kenawy stood and guided the group, acting as an urban shepherd. Kenawy intended for the piece to be a spectacle, encroach on public space, and serve as a critique on social injustices, all of which appealed to Nikki Columbus, Townhouse Gallery's manager and curator who was in charge of the "Assume the Position" exhibit. The Silence of Lambs performance took place on December 14, 2009, and was filmed from several different angles by the technical team at Townhouse Gallery. After its conclusion, the performance was exhibited for a second time as a videographic experience.

This project is one of the final instances in which Kenawy brings her work outside of the gallery setting and into the streets of Cairo due to the amount of backlash she received for the piece. Questions were raised by critics and Egyptians alike regarding the ethics of the performance; describing a lack of transparency in communication with day labourers hired to perform the artwork, with shop owners in the area where it was conducted, and with the spectators who did not understand who the targeted audience was or why the piece was performed. Kenawy is criticized by some who say her work is too codified which leads to misinterpretation, yet others commend her for confronting and exploring the lived and human condition in such a provocative way.

Initially, to acquire performers Kenawy had placed an open-call at the American University of Cairo (AUC) hoping to have students from the fine arts program participate as volunteers. Kenawy told William Wells, the director of Townhouse Gallery, that she had been very transparent with the students who offered to volunteer about the scope of their work, but he later discovered that she had not. Because of this, the students backed out shortly before the performance was scheduled to take place. To accommodate this loss, Kenawy pitched hiring Egyptian day labourers, but Wells denied this request saying the labourers would not fully understand their role in the artwork, leaving them unethically taken advantage of. Kenawy chose to override this denial and hired labourers without informing the gallery. The film captures the adverse reactions Kenawy is met with from bystanders because of her choice in actors, voicing their opinions that the performance was humiliating for these lower-class workers because they were made spectacle to upper-class citizens.

The performance also coincided with two other large events in Cairo: the 25th Alexandria Biennale and an international curating workshop organized by Tate Modern and hosted by Townhouse Gallery. These events brought upper-class members of the art community to Cairo, which is another reason why critics question Kenawy's intentions for the piece. Due to the work being recorded and viewed by an audience of Egyptian and international art professionals, residents of Cairo were outraged because they considered the work to be tarnishing the image of Egypt and its people. They expressed these feelings to Kenawy during the performance and the display was abruptly terminated when the confrontation turned violent and law enforcement was involved.

The performers and Kenawy were arrested, resulting in Townhouse Gallery being forced to give greater compensation to the workers than originally negotiated as well as pay for Kenawy to be freed from detainment. The Silence of Lambs was censored entirely from Townhouse Gallery and the "Assume the Position" exhibition following this and was not shown again until the 12th International Cairo Biennale where it won the grand prize.

== Awards ==
- 1998 UNESCO Grand Prize at the 7th Cairo International Biennial
- 1998 The AICA commission (Marseilles Art Studios), France
- 2003 Special mention at International Ismailia Festival for Documentary and Short Films, Egypt
- 2004 Grant of Pro-Helvetia Swiss Arts Council, Artists residency, Aarau /Switzerland
- 2004 The State National Prize for Art, Science, Literature, for using Video as Visual medium, Egypt
- 2004 Dakar Biennale award
- 2005 The 23rd Alexandria Biennial Golden Prize
- 2005 The global crossings prize, Leonardo/ISAST, the International Society for the Arts, Sciences and Technology, Los Angeles, USA
- 2006 Dakar Biennale award
- 2010 The 12th Cairo International Biennial grand prize
- 2010 The Sharjah International Biennial award
