= Dina Danish =

French-born Egyptian artist

Dina Danish (born 1981) is a French-born Egyptian artist who lives and works in Amsterdam.

== Biography ==
Danish was born in Paris, grew up in Cairo and received a BA from the American University in Cairo and a MFA from the California College of the Arts. She was artist-in-residence at the Rijksakademie van beeldende kunsten.

Danish's art work meshes the concepts of art's engrossment with languages from around the world and framework with an element in humor, misinterpretation, improper translation and superstition. Her work, which incorporates various media including sculpture, photographs and video, has appeared in exhibitions at Stedelijk Museum Schiedam, De Appel Art Centre in Amsterdam, the San Francisco Museum of Modern Art and Kunsthall Oslo.

In her work, Danish plays with language and structure, incorporating humour and misunderstanding. She also researches the subject matter of her work, going so far as to investigate the use of chewing gum by contemporary artists and in Egyptian cinema.

She received the Barclay Simpson Award in 2008, the illy Present Future Prize in 2011 at Artissima 18, and the Celeste Prize in 2012. She appeared on the short list for the 2016 Abraaj Group Art Prize.

Her work is held in the collections of De Nederlandsche Bank, the Nomas Foundation, the San Francisco Museum of Modern Art and the Museum of Modern Art. Danish's solo exhibitions include: Sports Memorabilia, Signed and Everything, (2018); The Poet Who Wanted to be Buried Underneath a Pinball Machine, (2016), both at Stigter van Doesburg, Amsterdam, the Netherlands; A Place in the Sun, Nile Sunset Annex, Cairo, Egypt (2016); Dictated But Not Read, Supplement Gallery, London (2015); To Be A Pinball, SpazioA, Pistoia, Italy (2015); Double Bubble Gum, Galerie Barbara Seiler, Zurich (2013);Re-Play: Back in 10 Minutes, SpazioA, Pistoia, Italy (2012); A Matter of Time, Galerie Barbara Seiler, Zurich (2011). Her work has been exhibited in group exhibitions at Kunsthall Oslo, Contemporary Image Collective (CIC) in Cairo in collaboration with Kunsthalle Bern, and at Annet Gelink, Amsterdam, and she performed Kurt Schwitters’ Ursonata at the Cairo Pavilion of the Amsterdam Biennial.

Additionally, Danish was an artist-in-residence at the Rijksakademie van Beeldende Kunsten in Amsterdam from 2009 to 2010; Fondazione Spinola Banna Per L’Arte, Turin, 2011; and PiST///, Istanbul, 2012; and spends most of the rest of her time in Amsterdam.

== Back In X Minutes ==
In 2012, Dina Danish created a project called Back In X Minutes, where she pledged to produce thirty-five paintings mimicking Post-It notes. Each Post-It note reads: “Back in x minute(s),” depending on the edition (x=from 1–35). Her concept behind this project was to demonstrate the reality of machines in our world, which make countless identical standard sized Post-its. Dina stated that she wanted to make several identical standard sized Post-its because she is not a machine and, therefore, there would be slight differences in each piece in the series.

== The Admirer and The Admired ==
In 2016, Dina Danish collaborated with Jean-Baptiste Maitre on a series called The Admirer and The Admired. The project dives into the way artefacts relate to their displays. The Admirer and The Admired studies the way that objects from foreign cultures are often left out of major museum exhibits and how the subtle visuals of an exhibit are the first thing that audiences notice when viewing an exhibition. Danish and Maitre did extensive research and development while working on this series. They began the collaboration after recognizing a common interest in the way that forms are displayed and arranged in different museum spaces. The exhibition has been put on at both Tyson in Cologne and at the Institute of Art History at LMU Munich.
