= Mona Zaalouk =

Egyptian painter (1947–1995)

- Born: 1947; Egypt
- Died: 1995 (aged 47–48)
- Education: American University in Cairo
- Occupations: Painter, tapestry designer
- Movement: Abstraction

Mona Zaalouk (1947 – 1995) was an Egyptian abstract painter and tapestry designer. She lived in Paris for some ten years at the end of her life.

== Biography ==
Mona Zaalouk was born in 1947, in Egypt. Zaalouk graduated from the American University in Cairo in English literature (1967), and she did additional studies at the same university in theatre directing. She had been a student of Fouad Kamel (1919–1973), the noted Egyptian surrealist painter.

In her early artwork she made tapestries from the thick woolen thread. She later pivoted to making paintings, and using sand, rocks and natural minerals for pigments and color.

Zaalouk has held solo exhibitions at the French Cultural Centre, Cairo (1979); at the Centre Culturel d'Égypte, Paris (1982); at the Van Loo Gallery, Brussels (1988); at the Galerie Salem, Paris (1989); and at the Galerie Gramme, Paris (1991). She has been featured in group exhibitions, including at the Cairo Salon (1978, 1979); the Salon d'Art Sacré, Paris (1982); and the Salon des Femmes Peintres Sculpteurs, Paris (1986).

Her work is included in museum collections, including at the Jordan National Gallery of Fine Arts in Amman, Jordan. The Warren M. Robbins Library at the National Museum of African Art in Washington, D.C. have her artists' file and archives.
