= Doaa el-Adl =

Egyptian cartoonist (born 1979)

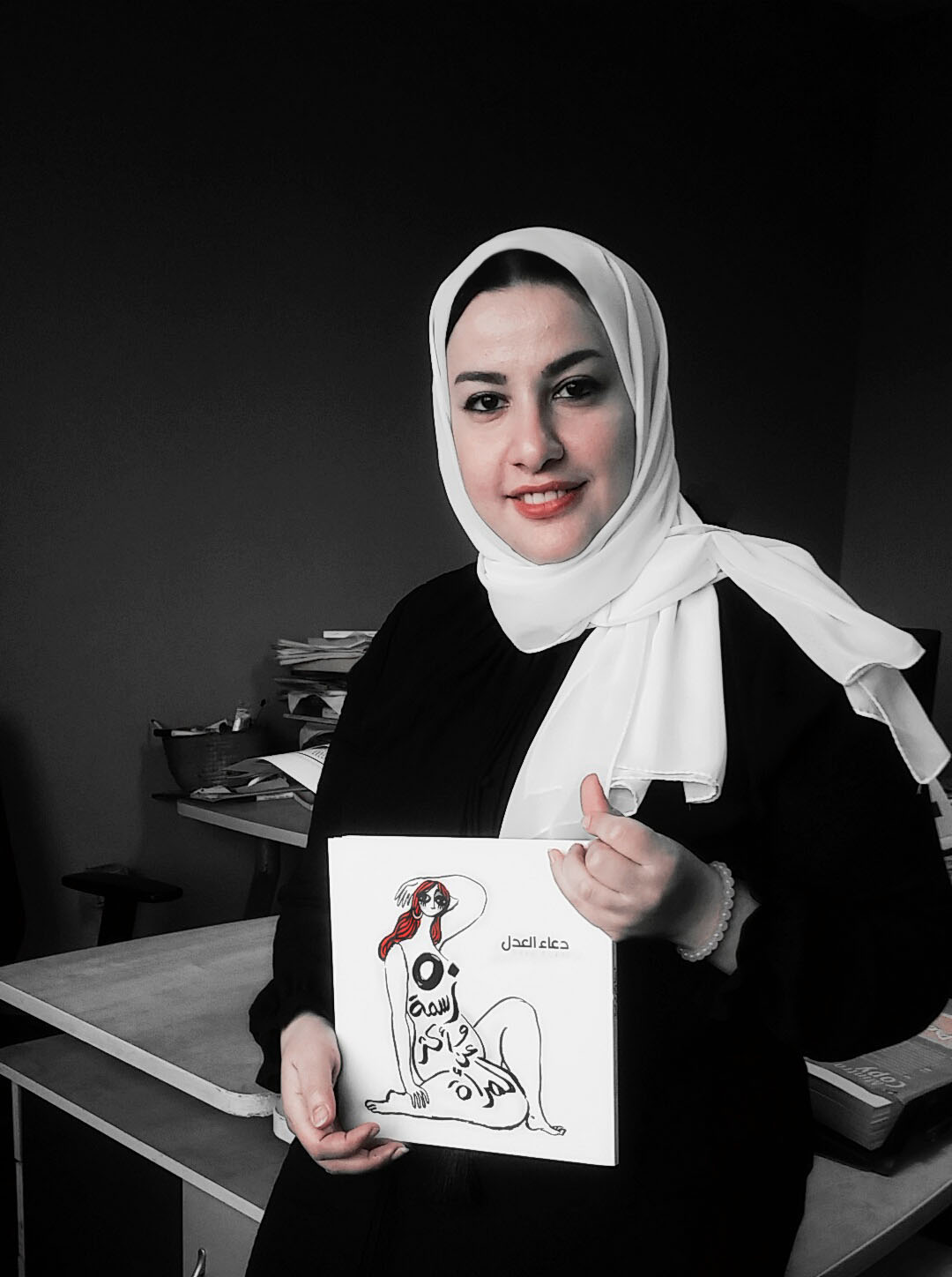
Doaa el-Adl with her book: "50 Drawings and more about Women" (2017)

Doaa el-Adl (Arabic: دعاء العدل; born 6 February 1979 in Damietta) is an Egyptian cartoonist currently working for the Al-Masry Al-Youm newspaper, known for her satirical cartoons with strong political, social or religious themes. She has been cited as Egypt's most famous female cartoonist. Her work at Al-Masry Al-Youm has received considerable attention and created controversy. She lives and works in Cairo.

== Education ==
el-Adl studied Fine Arts at Alexandria University, graduating in 2000.

== Career ==
el-Adl began publishing her cartoons in 2007. She has worked as a cartoonist for Al-Dustour, Rose al-Yūsuf and Sabah El Kheir, and has illustrated for Qatr El Nada, Alaa-El Din and Bassem. She is now employed by Al-Masry Al-Youm. In 2009 she became the first woman to win the Journalistic Distinction in Caricature award.

In 2014 El Adl was honoured by the French foundation Cartooning for Peace. The award was presented by Former UN Secretary General Kofi Annan, who said that the prize "recognises those who commit their voices and artistic talent to the cause of peace and tolerance and who use a universal language of images to inform and educate and celebrate our common humanity".

In 2016 she was included in the BBC's 100 Women project.

== Work ==
After the Egyptian revolution of 2011, her work became strongly critical of President Mohamed Morsi.

el-Adl created controversy in December 2012 when Al-Masry Al-Youm published her cartoon depicting an angel informing Adam and Eve that they could have stayed in the Garden of Eden if they had voted for the right candidate. According to el-Adl, the cartoon was intended as a criticism of "politicians taking advantage of religion and using it to dominate and influence simple people", but led to her being accused of blasphemy by Khaled El Masry, a Salafi lawyer and then Secretary General of the Salafist Front's National Centre for Defending Freedoms. The suit claimed that the cartoon insulted the role of Adam in Islam. An investigation was ordered by Attorney General Talaat Abdallah; this was dropped after the 2013 Egyptian coup d'etat.

The same year, she was questioned by prosecutor general Talaat Abdallah for a cartoon in which she criticized Islamists in Egypt and their influence in politics. She was defended by Brazilian cartoonist Carlos Latuff, who depicted el-Adl defending herself against an Islamist with a spear-like pencil.

In February 2013, el-Adl created a cartoon to criticise female genital mutilation, by illustrating a seedy-looking man climbing a ladder and stretching, holding a pair of scissors, to cut off a red flower between a woman's legs. Speaking to Clitoraid in 2013, El Adl explained, "Before the revolution took place, I was casually drawing about women's issues and their problems, but now I am compelled to draw these cartoons about women in order to defend my own existence, my personal freedom that are threatened under the rule of the Muslim Brotherhood." Her cartoons depicting the trial of President Hosni Mubarak were also popular.

In 2016, her work covered international topics including Brexit, the attack on the Bacha Khan University attack and Stop Violence Against Women.

== Awards ==
- 2009 Egyptian Journalists' Syndicate's Journalistic Distinction in Caricature
- 2013 41st Forte dei Marmi Prize for Political Satire, in the category of international satirical drawings.
