= Doa Aly =

Egyptian visual artist, choreographer, filmmaker and writer

Doa Aly (دعاء علي)
- Born: Egypt
- Education: Helwan University
- Occupations: Visual artist, choreographer, filmmaker and writer
- Years active: 2001 - present
- Notable work: The End Comes Not For Me; Only When All the Poison Has Gone; MAGNUNA; Semenkh-Ka Re: The Many Forms of Silence; Metamorphoses: The Sequences
- Children: 1
- Website: https://www.doaaly.com/

Doa Aly is an Egyptian visual artist, choreographer, filmmaker and writer.

== Early life ==
Aly studied at the Faculty of Fine Arts at Helwan University in Cairo, and received her Bachelor of Fine Arts in painting in 2001.

== Approach ==
Doa Aly's work evolved into a research-based practice that generates multiple outcomes across numerous media. Her projects unfold through the deconstruction, reinterpretation and re-appropriation of various sources, drawn from literature, history, and current events.

Her interdisciplinary practice spans writing, drawing, installation, digital cinema, and performance.

== Career ==
Her work has been featured in exhibitions at the Singapore Art Museum, 32Bis in Tunis, Art Jameel, Sharjah Biennial 13 off-site project BAHAR in Istanbul, the Center for Curatorial Studies and Hessel Museum of Art, Annandaleon-Hudson in New York, The Abraaj Group Art Prize in Dubai, the Institute of Contemporary Arts in London, the Delfina Foundation also in London, the Museum of Modern Art in Warsaw, the Museum of Modern and Contemporary Art (MMCA) in Seoul, the Biennial: EVA International in Limerick, Beirut Art Center in Beirut and the Royal Museum of Fine Arts in Antwerp. Her films and performances have been shown by the New Museum in New York, the Tate Modern, and The Museum of Modern Art (MoMA).

== Works ==
=== The Day God Imploded ===
An immersive five channel audio-video installation, adapted from two literary sources: Jean Eugene Robert-Houdin's Confidences (1858; published in English translation in 1859 as Memoirs of Robert-Houdin) and Albert Camus's novel L’Étranger (1942, 1946 in English as The Stranger). The first and second scenes describe how an illusionist helped suppress the Muslim resistance in French Algeria. The third scene features an act of wanton killing on a beach in French Algiers.

=== Only When All the Poison Has Gone ===
Only when all the poison has gone (The healing of Emily Ruete) is based on the writings of Emily Ruete, born Salamah bint Said bin Sultan, Princess of Oman and Zanzibar (1844–1924), as introduced by Emeri van Donzel in An Arabian Princess Between Two Worlds: Memoirs, Letters Home, Sequels to the Memoirs, Syrian Customs and Usages, published in 1993. The film was commissioned by 32Bis, Tunis.

=== MAGNUNA 1: Hayyuna ===
MAGNUNA is a practice-based project dedicated to the narratives of female madness in Arabo-Islamic literature from the Middle Ages. It assays a feminist, historical discourse analysis of medieval Islamic madness and its contemporary reverberations by examining how the identity of the majzoub (“attracted by God”) was formulated, and the socio-cultural factors involved in the categorization of madness as holiness. Hayouna was commissioned by the Bergen Academy for Art and Design.

=== Semenkh-Ka Re: The Many Forms of Silence ===
Semenkh-Ka Re: The Many Forms of Silence (MFS) is a drawing and sculpture installation inspired by two relics in the collection of the Egyptian Museum in Cairo. In 2017, during a visit to the Egyptian Museum, Doa Aly came across the haunting debris of an excavation: two blocks of clay, approximately 35 x 25 cm each, with twisted bands of gold and fragments of stone (bone?) embedded in them. They were part of a jewelry display, surrounded by an array of gold trinkets. A wall label referred to the displayed items as “Jewels of King Semenkh-Ka Re,” excavated from a site that archeologists have designated Tomb 55 of the Valley of the Kings, or KV55. This project is a Singapore Biennale 2022 commission.

=== Metamorphoses: The Sequences ===
Metamorphoses: The Sequences is a four-part film series based on stories from Ovid's narrative poem Metamorphoses, using Charles Martin's 2004 book Metamorphoses: A New Translation as its primary source.
