= Mariam A. Aleem =

Egyptian artist (1930–2010)

- Born: December 28, 1930
- Died: April 26, 2010 (aged 79)
- Education: Helwan University
- Notable work: Graphic design

Mariam A. Aleem (28 December 1930 – 26 April 2010) was an Egyptian artist and art professor specializing in printed design. She received her Bachelor of Arts from the Faculty of Fine Arts Cairo in 1954 and her Master of Fine Arts in graphic printing 1957 from the University of Southern California. Beginning in 1958, Aleem taught printmaking at the Faculty of Fine Arts in Alexandria. In 1968 she became an assistant professor, heading the Printmaking Department. Aleem became a full professor in 1975 and led the Design Department from 1985 to 1990. She earned her Ph.D. in the history of art from Helwan University in Cairo. Aleem exhibited worldwide, with shows in the United States, Lebanon, Egypt, Germany, Italy, and Norway.

== Notable awards ==
- Biennial Norwegian Festival (1954)
- The National Order for Art and Science of the First Degree from Egypt (1974)
- International Year of the Woman from Egypt and Italy (1975)
- First Prize, Biennial Norwegian Festival (1984)

== Selected exhibitions ==
- 1954 Biennial Norwegian Festival
- 1964 Venice Biennial, Venice, Italy
- 1971 Aspects of Contemporary Egyptian Art (Visages de l'Art Contemporain Égyptien), the Musée Galliéra, Paris
- 1984 International Exhibition of Graphics, Yokohama, Japan
- 1987 International Graphics Exhibition, East Germany
- 1991 Triennial, Finland
- 1994 Forces of Change: Artists of the Arab World, the National Museum of Women in the Arts, Washington
