= Marguerite Nakhla =

Egyptian artist (1908–1977)

- Born: December 10, 1908; Alexandria, Egypt
- Died: 1977 (aged 68–69); Alexandria
- Resting place: Alexandria
- Education: École nationale des Beaux-Arts; École du Louvre
- Relatives: Hélène Ghobrial-Assaad, Hani Assaad

Marguerite Nakhla (Arabic: مرجريت نخلة) was a modern Egyptian painter (1908–1977), born on December 10, 1908, in Alexandria, Egypt.

== Early life and education ==
Because of her gender, Nakhla was not allowed to attend the newly established Egyptian School of Fine Arts. Instead she attended an all-girls school, taught in French and operated by nuns. After completing her primary education, Nakhla attended Pedagogic Arts Institute for Women Teachers before deciding to study art at the École nationale des Beaux-Arts in Paris, France. She graduated from the Paris art school in 1939 and returned to Egypt, where she taught and exhibited her own art for the next nine years.

== Career ==
In 1948, Nakhla returned to Paris to continue her studies at the École du Louvre. She would remain in Paris for another three years while she studied graphic arts, fresco painting, and continued to exhibit her work. Nakhla's work was even acquired by the Egyptian Embassy in Paris.

Nakhla continued to travel between Paris and Alexandria for several years before settling in Alexandria. She stopped exhibiting her work in 1975, just two years before her death in 1977.

She received her teaching Diploma in 1939, then studied muralism at the École du Louvre in 1951. She taught at the Institute of Fine Arts for Girls, Egypt. She lived in Alexandria, Paris, Cairo and Port Said.

== Exhibitions ==
=== Special exhibitions ===
- The first special exhibition in the French city of Anneber 1936
- Exhibition of the work of the Egyptian Embassy in Paris 1948
- Show Bernham Gallery 1954
- An exhibition of her work in Cairo - Alexandria - Port Said
- Comprehensive exhibition of work, 1965

=== Local exhibitions ===
- Agro-industrial exhibition 1931
- Exhibition of art lovers in Alexandria 1932
- Exhibitions Autumn Salon - Salon Ordinations
- Cairo International Market 1958
- Society of Fine Arts, exhibition of her work 1978
- Egyptian Woman Creations 1999 (a special exhibition of her work)
- Exhibition for the Alexandrian art pioneers, Heliopolis 2007
- Egyptian Modern Art Museum Exhibition in January 2008

=== International exhibitions ===
- Paris International Exhibition 1937
- Egypt-France Exhibition Museum Decorative Arts in Paris 1949
- International Fair Deauville, France, 1960
- Three competitions for students of the High School of Fine Arts-year 36 / 37 / 1939, France

== Awards and recognition ==
=== Missions and grants ===
1965 full-time grant of artistic production for a year

=== International awards ===
- First prize in three competitions in France for students of School 1936 - 1938
- Medal of the Paris International Exhibition 1937
- A certificate of excellence for the international painting exhibition Deauville, France

== See also ==
- Coptic art
- Coptic Orthodox Church of Alexandria
- Icon
- List of prominent Copts
