= Hend Kheera =

Egyptian street artist (born 1981)

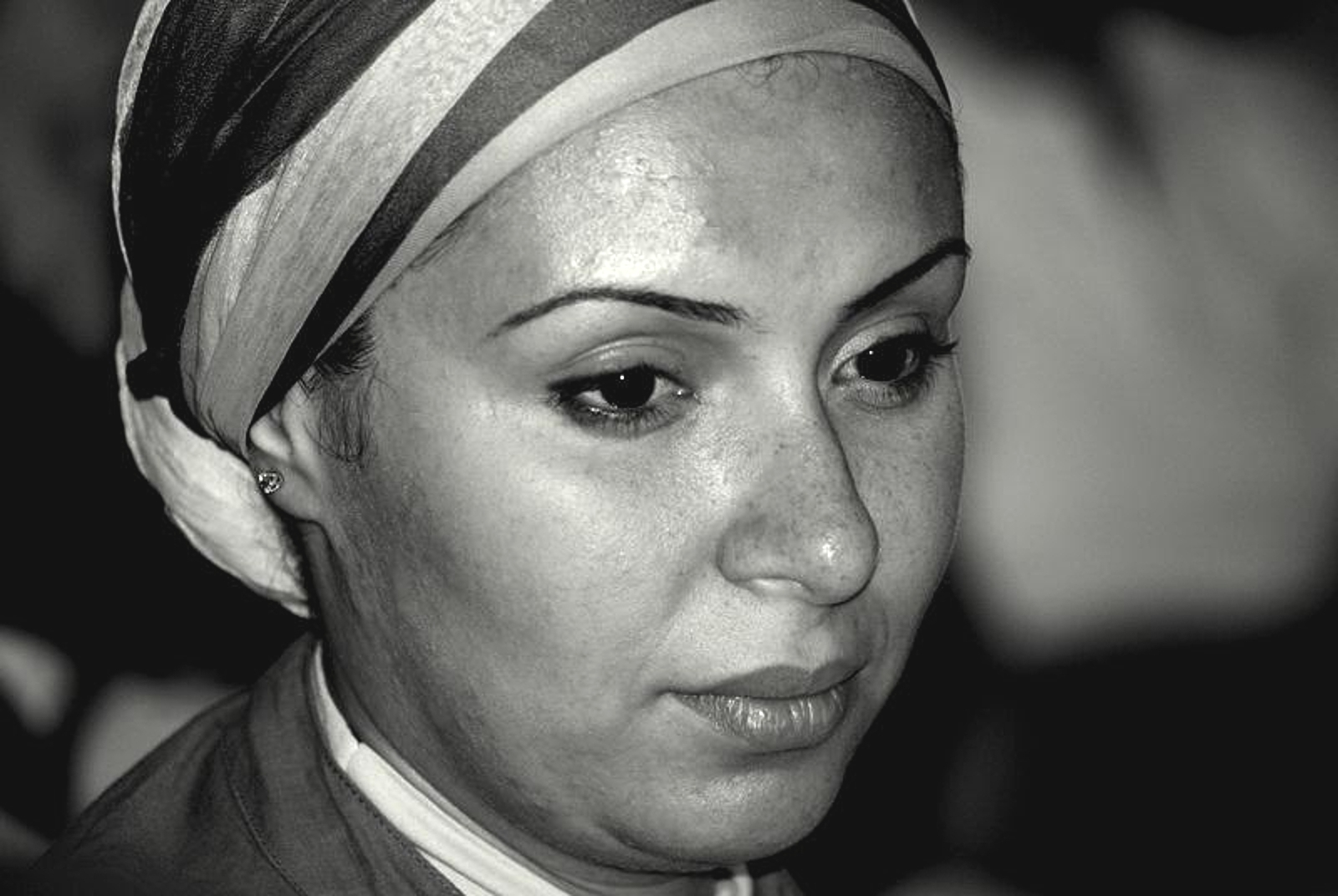
- Born: 1981 (age 44–45); Cairo, Egypt
- Occupation: Street Artist

Hend Kheera (Arabic: هند خيرة) (born 1981) is an Egyptian street artist whose work features a mix of stencils and slogans. She is one of the leaders of Egypt's street-art boom since the 2011 uprising. Kheera has been an active participant in anti-sexual harassment campaign in Egypt in response to mass sexual assault in Egypt.

== Biography ==
Hend Kheera first rose to prominence as an artist after the Egyptian revolution of 2011. While studying at university, she worked as a fashion designer. She now works as a structural engineer, but continues to use graffiti as an outlet for her creative side.

Hend Kheera painted stencils around Tahrir square during sit-ins in 2011. She also launched a graffiti campaign against sexual harassment in Cairo and her work features prominent issues facing women in Egyptian society today.

== Work ==
Hend Kheera's work can be seen on the walls of the Mogamma, Egypt's administrative building in Tahrir Square and other streets throughout Cairo. Her work portrays her personal struggle as a woman and pushes the boundaries of what is socially acceptable in Egyptian society. Hend Kheera began creating most of her famous pieces during the 2011 Egyptian revolution that took place in Cairo in January 2011. Around this time, there was a rise in street art with street artist such as Kheera voicing their stance through their art. Hend Kheera's feature on the Rolling Stone magazine allowed her work to receive recognition, as she is the first female graffiti artist to be featured on the Rolling Stone. Another Egyptian artist, Mira Shihadeh and Kheera have contributed to the sexual harassment movement in Egypt through street art. In her Rolling Stone, article that featured Kheera she was quoted as saying, "a wall is more powerful than a media channel, for example, because you can't ignore it."

Through her art, she has participated in anti-sexual harassment campaigns, and one of her most well-known pieces is based on the trial of Samira Ibrahim, who took the government to court in August last year as a result of her strip-search by a military doctor after she and several other women were detained at a protest in Tahrir Square, then videotaped while the doctor violated them. Kheera's work is a provocative stenciled outline of a woman, crossed out in red, with the caption, "Don't touch. Castration awaits." Another of her most well-known pieces features Jesus about to get run over, standing with his back turned to a rampaging tank while holding up a blank sign in protest. This piece was featured in the Townhouse Gallery exhibition titled "This is not Graffiti."

Her main influences are derived from books and films, rather than other artists. She has used certain characters from literature and cinema in her work including Hend Rostom, the famous Egyptian actress who was known as the 'Marilyn Monroe of Egypt' and Ahmed Zaki, an Egyptian actor who starred in the 1980s classic movie 'The Escape'.

In an interview with Rolling Stone, Hend Kheera stated that her street art has never caused her trouble with the authorities. However, some of her artwork has been covered up or removed by authorities and she has been criticized by some members of the public who find her work too offensive. Other artist around the world have also credited Hend Kheera for inspiring their work.

=== Exhibitions ===
Kheera also has been featured in the "Underpass in the Eyes of Freedom" Exhibit at Union Deport in Minneapolis as well as in Sept. 2011 was featured in This is Not Graffiti, collective exhibition in Townhouse Gallery, Egypt.
