= Zeinab Abd al-Hamid =

Egyptian artist (1919–2002)

- Born: January 27, 1919; Qalyubia
- Died: November 9, 2002 (aged 83); Cairo
- Education: Academy of Fine Arts of Alexandria; Real Academia de Bellas Artes de San Fernando
- Known for: Colour saturated paintings of Egyptian cities
- Spouse: Ezzeldin Hamouda

Zeinab Abd al-Hamid (27 January 1919 – 9 November 2002) was an Egyptian artist known for her colour saturated paintings of Egyptian cities. Abd al-Hamid used an array of media, from watercolours to oils. While art historians struggled to place her works in a single art movement, the general consensus is that her paintings are part of the Egyptian modernist movement.

== Early life ==
Zeinab Abd al-Hamid was born on 27 January 1919 in Qalyubia, an Egyptian governorate located north of Cairo, Egypt. Her early years were marked by the Egyptian Revolution of 1919 and the waves of social, political and cultural shifts in her country. These events influenced her anti-conformist personality, her artistic trajectory, and her vision of Egypt. From early on, she developed her painting skills and her passion for art in classes at the studio of the Egyptian artist Hamed Abdallah.

== Career ==
After graduating from the Academy of Fine Arts of Alexandria, Egypt, in 1945, Abd al-Hamid stayed in Egypt for two years. During this time, she participated in the foundation and development of the Modern/Contemporary Arts Group, founded in 1946, which she joined a year later. This group also included her husband Ezzeldin Hamouda, as well as other artists such as Abd al-Hadi al-Gazzar and Gazbia Sirry. She was involved in many exhibitions in Egypt with the group, even when she lived abroad.

In 1948, her husband was offered by the Egyptian government a scholarship to go to Madrid, Spain, so she left with him, and obtained a graduate degree there from the Royal Academy of Fine Arts of San Fernando. After obtaining her professorship in 1952, she and her husband returned to Cairo, where she started teaching at the Institute of Art Education.

The 1950s brought a change in the Egyptian state's approach to culture, suddenly oriented towards supporting local artists. Abd al-Hamid rose to prominence during this period: she was nominated among other Egyptian artists for the 1956 inaugural Guggenheim International Award, and represented Egypt and the United Arab Republic at the Venice Biennale of 1958. Her painting style started getting identified at that time, especially her depiction of the Cairo urban landscape and its daily scenes.

In 1969, she went back to professorship, at the Faculty of Art Education of Helwan University. A notable experience was her sabbatical in Washington D.C., where she and her husband exhibited their work at the International Monetary Fund and the Academy of Sciences. They both continued to paint portraits of the dignitaries they met and landscapes of the U.S. capital. Hamouda died in 1990, Abd al-Hamid organized a solo exhibition a year later in his memory in Cairo. She continued to paint after his death and was even commissioned a large-scale mural for the al-Ahram Newspaper Building in Cairo in 1992.

== Legacy ==
Zeinab Abd al-Hamid died in Egypt on 9 November 2002, aged 83, leaving behind her a significant collection of paintings and awards. Her work has been exhibited all around the world: Egypt, Italy, Austria, the United States, Hungary, Spain, and Brazil, and she was awarded many prizes during her career.
