= George Bahgoury =

Egyptian-French artist

George Al Bahgoury جورج البهجورى
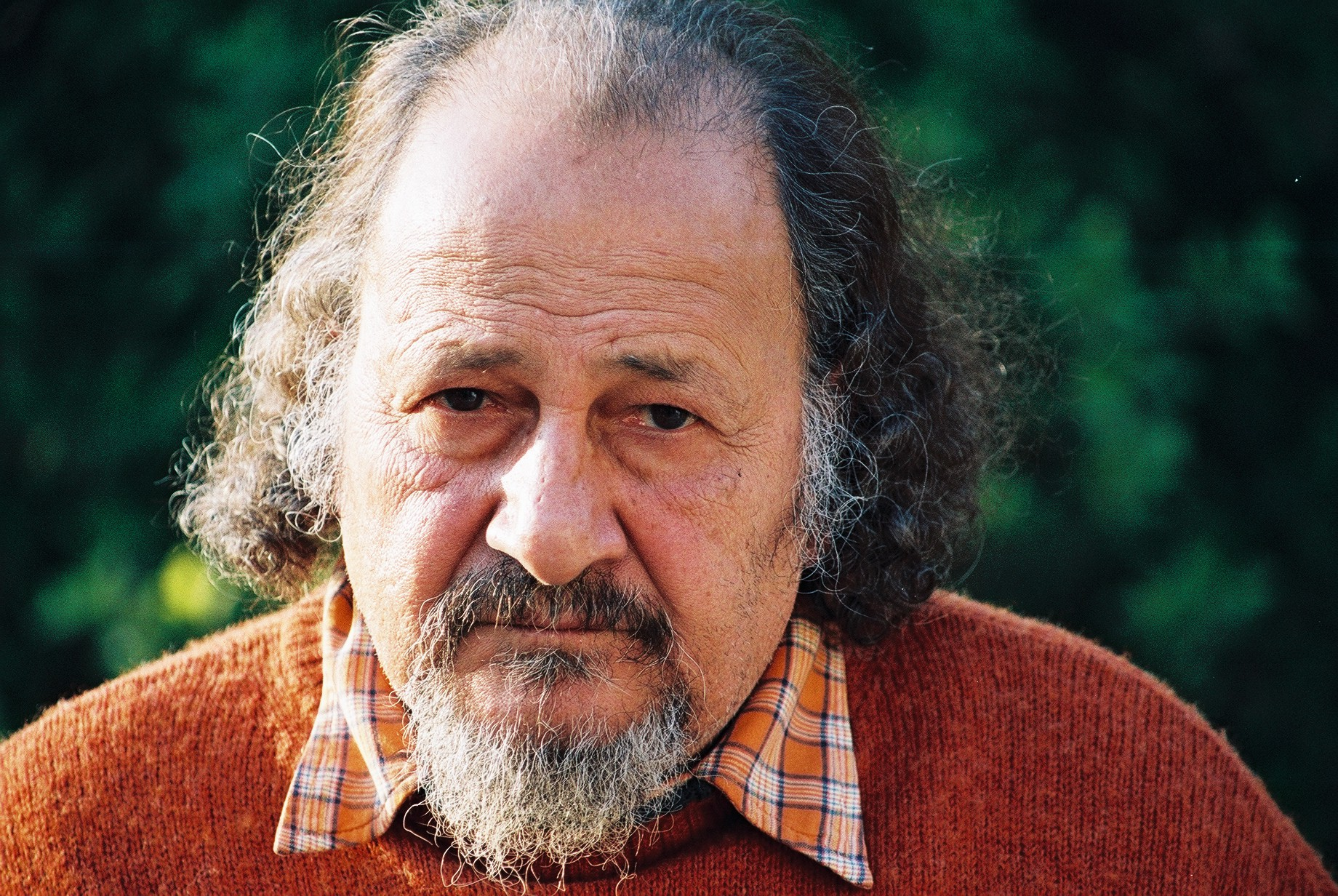
- George Al Bahgoury in Loxur 2003
- Born: 1932 (age 93–94); Luxor, Egypt
- Occupation: Artist

George Bahgoury Autoportrait

George Abdel Masih Al Bahgoury or George Bahgoury (جورج البهجورى) is an Egyptian-French artist. An accomplished painter and sculptor, he is most famous as a caricaturist and political cartoonist.

== Life and career ==
Bahgoury was born in 1932 into a Coptic Christian family in Bahgora, a small village in Nag Hammadi, Upper Egypt hence the name of his family, ‘Bahgoury’ (coming from Bahgora). In 1953, he embarked on his career as a political cartoonist, a role that would see him featured in Sabah Al Khair and Rose El Youssef. In 1955, he studied painting at the Faculty of Fine Arts in Zamalek, Cairo, under the guidance of the Egyptian artist Hussein Bikar. In 1970, he studied at the Academy of Fine Arts in Paris. Soon thereafter, in 1975, he ceased publishing as a cartoonist.

A Silver Medalist for his painting "A Face from Egypt", Bahgoury's artwork has been widely displayed in galleries and museums, including the Louvre Museum, the Museum of Modern Art in Amman, the Museum of Modern Art in Cairo, and the Al Masar Gallery for Contemporary Art in Zamalek, Cairo.

== Exhibitions ==
- He staged many exhibitions in Egypt and abroad around. Some of the most important:

Local exhibitions

- 1976, 15th Spring Exhibition – Cairo.
- 2004, 1st Exhibition of Press Illustrations, at Palace of Arts. Cairo.
- 2005, 29th National Exhibition of Fine Arts. Cairo.
- 2006, "Ramdaniat" Exhibition at Salama Gallery – Mohandessen. Cairo.
- 2007, "Art and Grant" Exhibition at Al-Oruba Rotary Club. Cairo.
- 2007, 1st Festival of Fine Creation, "30th General Exhibition and 1st Fine Art Fair". Cairo.
- 2008, Festival of Sketches and Mini Tableaus at Shadecor Gallery – Heliopolis. Cairo.
- 2008, Caricature Exhibition at Mahmoud Saeed Center of Museums – Alexandria.

International exhibitions

- 1966, Venice Biennail – Italy.
- 1965, Alexandria Biennail – Egypt.
- 1977, Exhibition of the Contemporary Art – Sudan.
- 1984, Contemporary Arab Art Exhibition – Tunisia.
- 2005, 2nd International Biennail of Book Fancy – Alexandria Library. Egypt.
- 2007, "Egyptian Smiles" Exhibition – 18th Gabrufu Biennale – Bulgueria.
- 2008, 13th Aswan International Symposium of Sculpture – Egypt.

Solo shows

- More than 100 exhibitions all over the world. The most important done in Egypt:
- 1973, at Fine Arts Gallery – Cairo.
- 1998, at Mashrabia Gallery of Cont. Art, Downtown - Cairo
- 1996, at Mashrabia Gallery of Cont. Art, Downtown - Cairo
- 1996, at Khan Al-Maghraby Gallery – Cairo.
- 1999, at Arabesque Gallery – Cairo.
- 2000, at Picasso Gallery – Cairo.
- 2005, "Bahgoury Cafe" Exhibition, at Picasso Gallery – Cairo.
- 2007, At Nahdet Misr Gallery – Mahmoud Mukhtar Museum, Giza. Cairo.
- 2007, at Picasso Gallery, Zamalek – Cairo.
- 2017, at Picasso East Gallery, New Cairo - Cairo.
- 2019, at Liwan Gallery, Zamalek - Cairo.
- 2020, at Mashrabia Gallery of Cont. Art, Downtown - Cairo

== Writings ==
- Books : Port Said 65 – Sadat 80 – Paris 1990.
- Novels: " Trilogy of Icon" .

== Prizes ==
- 1978, Prize from Biennial of Caricature. Italy.
- 1979, Honorary Prize of Comic Strip in Damascus. Syria.
- Prize and Golden Medal by Franco Character Caricature. Spain.

== Collections ==
State collections

- Loumansi Museum. France.
- Museum of the Modern Art. Amman.
- Museum of the Modern Egyptian Art. Cairo, Egypt.
- Al-Shouna Museum. Alexandria, Egypt.

Private Collections

- Egyptian Embassy in France.
- Egyptian Embassy in England.

== Gallery ==
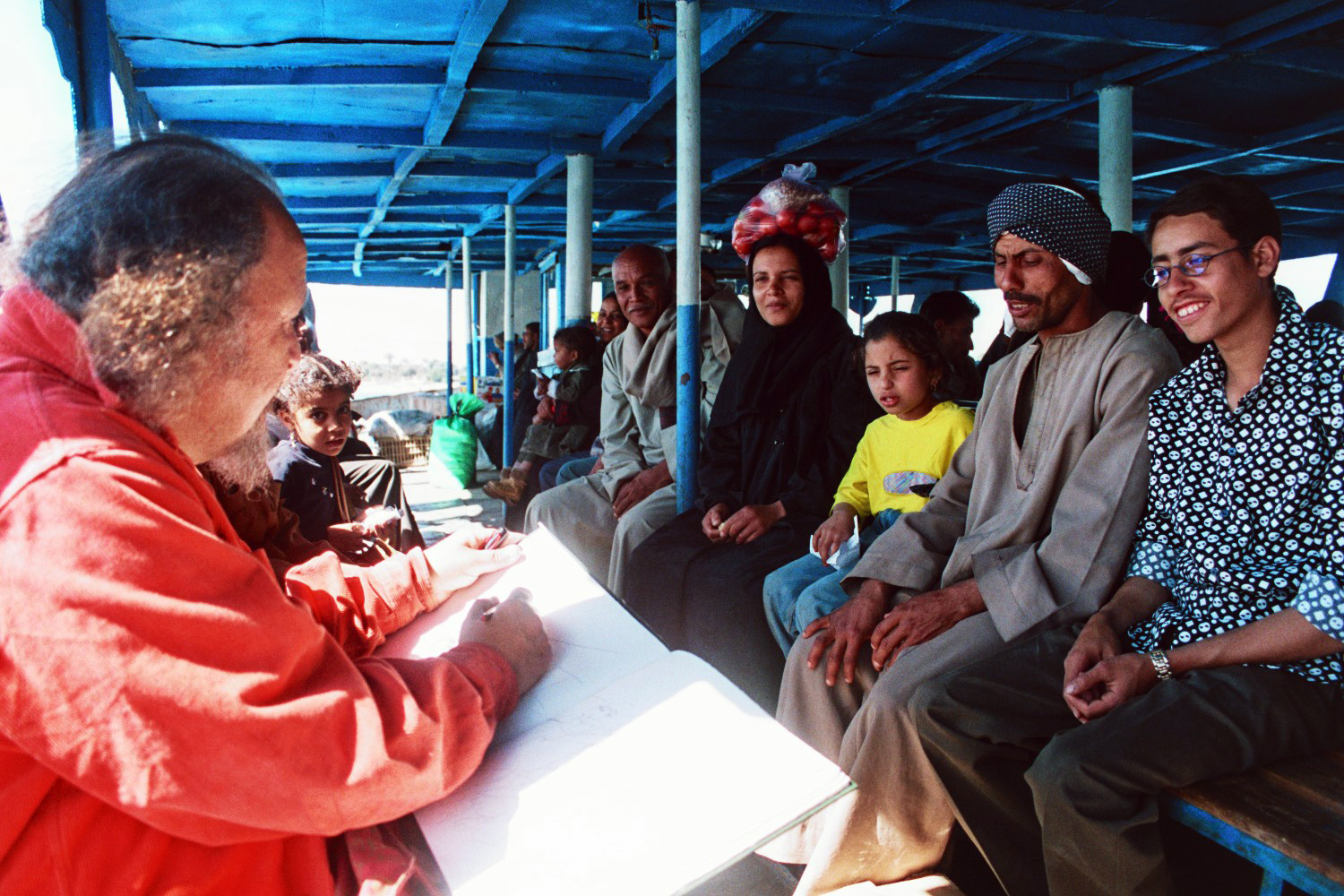
George Al Bahgoury in Loxur 2004 2

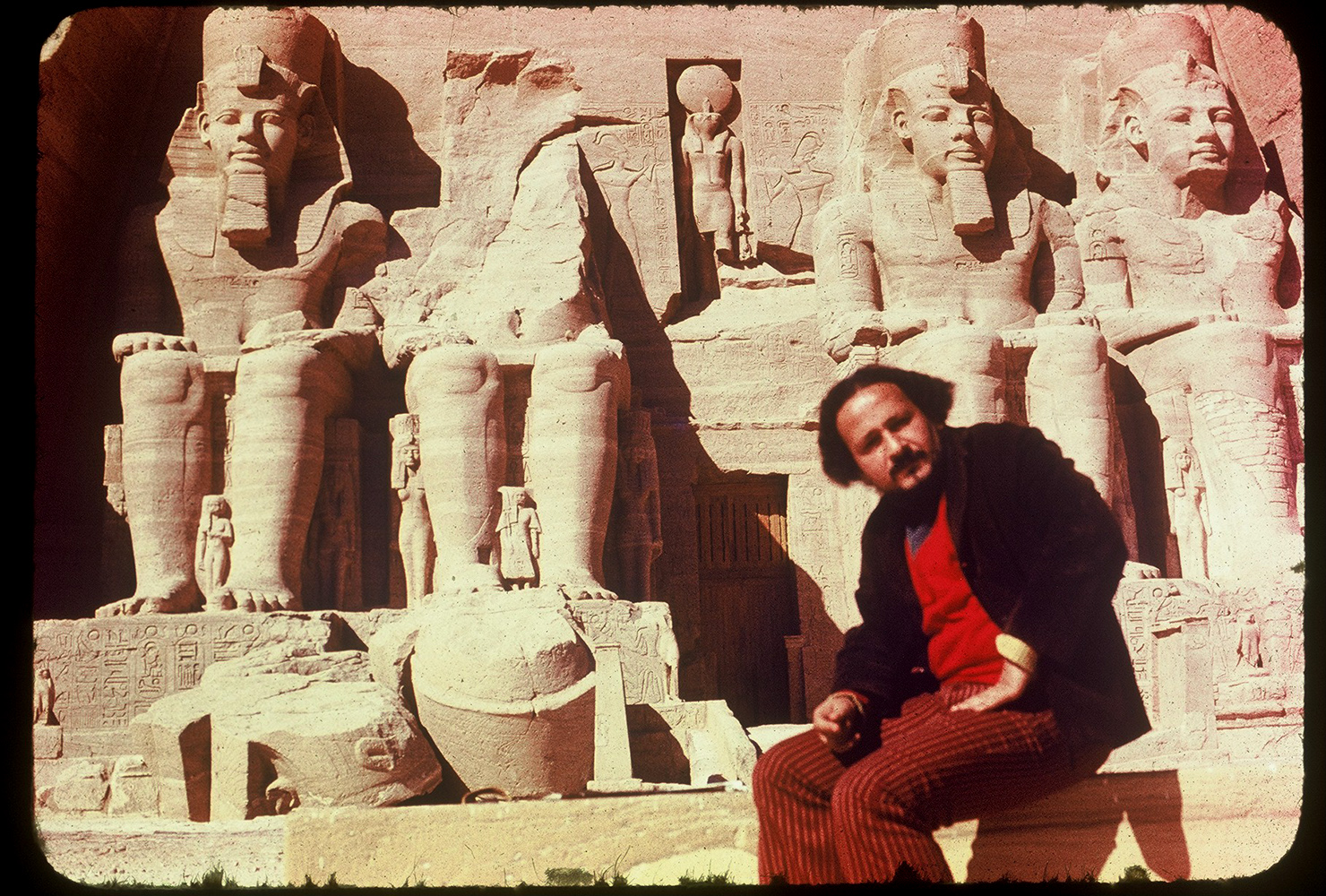
George Al Bahgoury in front of abu simbel temple

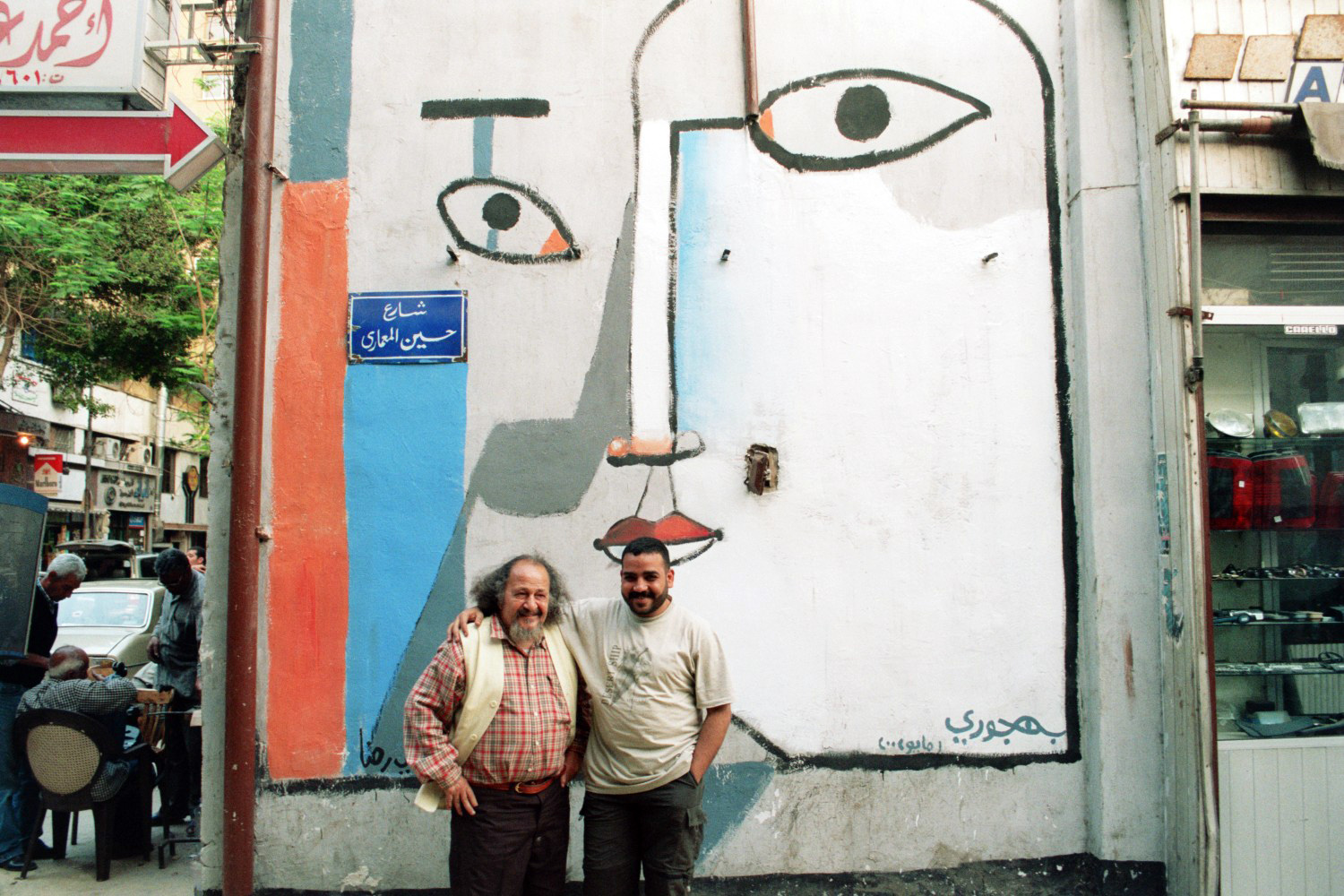
Bahgoury & Hamdy Down Town Cairo 2002
