= Tahia Halim =

Egyptian painter (1919–2003)

- Born: September 9, 1919; Sudan
- Died: May 24, 2003 (aged 83); Egypt
- Occupation: painter

Tahia Mohammed Halim (Arabic: تحية محمد حليم; September 9, 1919 – May 24, 2003) was an Egyptian painter. Tahia Halim was one of the pioneers of the Modern Expressive Movement in Egyptian Art in the 1960s, where she excelled in expressing the Egyptian character’s idiosyncrasies in her works. Many of her works concern the Nubian culture, the Nile, boats, and the popular and national subjects for which she has been granted several honorary awards in Egypt and abroad.

== Biography ==
Tahia Halim was born in Sudan, where her family were living. Her primary education was inside the Royal Palace of Cairo, where she was raised, as her father was the laureate of King Fuad I of Egypt.

Tahia Halim studied art under important drawing teachers as the Lebanese painter Yussef Trabelsi and the Greek artist Gerom; then under the Egyptian artist Hamed Abdallah at his studio 1943, and after their marriage, in 1945, they left for Paris to join Julian Academy (1949-1951). Came back to Egypt, they taught together art in their private studio, in Down Town (near Tahrir Square) in Cairo.

Tahia Halim received two devotion scholarships of Art Production in 1960 and in 1975.

== Tribute ==
On September 9, 2015, Google dedicated a Doodle to the painter for the 96th anniversary of her birth. The Doodle reached all the countries of the Arab World.

== Exhibitions ==
Solo shows-

- 1942 to 1996 many solo exhibitions in England and Sweden.
- 1996 "55 Years of Arts" exhibition. Khan el-Maghrabi, Cairo. Egypt.
- 1992 Diplomates Hall, the Egyptian Cultural Center, Cairo. Egypt.
- 2004 Ewart Gallery, The American University in Cairo (AUC). Egypt.

International exhibitions

- 1954 São Paulo Biennail. Brazil.
- 1955,1960,1970 Venice Biennial, Italy.
- 1955,1958,1960 Alexandria Biennial for Mediterranean Countries. Egypt.
- 1957 Guggenheim International Competition, New York. USA.
- 2016 The Sea Suspended, Tehran Museum of Contemporary Art. Iran.
- 2016 The Short Century, Sharjah Art Museum, UAE.

Local exhibitions

- Tahia Halim took part in many national and group exhibitions and Cairo Salon, since 1943.
- 2004 1st Drawing Salon (Black and White), Gezera Art Center, Cairo. Egypt.
- 2007 "Inside the Frame" exhibition. Khan EL-MaghrabiGallery, Cairo. Egypt.

== Prizes ==
National

- 1960: Golden medal in Painting, on the Knowledge Day. Egypt.
- 1969: The State Encouragemental Prize in Painting and the Order of Science and Art. Egypt.
- 1996 The State Encouragemental Prize. Egypt.

International

- 1958 Guggenheim International Competition, New York City. USA.

== Collections ==
Private collection

- Art lovers in Egypt and abroad.
- Barjeel Art Foundation
- Darat al Funun - The Khalid Shoman Foundation

State collection

- Museum of Modern Egyptian Art, Cairo, Egypt.
- Alexandria Modern Art Museum, Egypt.
- Modern Art Museum, Stockholm, Sweden.
