= Sawsan Amer =

Egyptian painter and art educator

- Born: 1937; Cairo, Egypt
- Occupations: Artist, Painter, Professor

Sawsan Amer (سوسن عامر; born 1937, in Cairo) is an Egyptian painter and art educator, considered as a pioneer Egyptian woman artist. She has been Director of the Art Research Unit at the Academy of the Arts and a professor on the faculty of Art Education at the College of Art Education.

== Education and career ==
Amer graduated from the College of Art Education, and has been Director of the Art Research Unit at the Academy of the Arts and a professor on the faculty of Art Education. She has authored a book and numerous articles on folk art, which has also inspired other artist's work. Furthermore, she was also noted for her paintings on glass and her collages, combining traditional iconography with personal imagery. Her work, inspired by traditional Arabic architecture, is known for its rich color sense.

== Awards ==
- Cairo Salon, 1972
- Research Award from the Egyptian Committee on Public Art, 1991

== Exhibitions ==
- Egyptian Cultural Center, Paris, 1978
- Egyptian Cultural Center, Paris, 1984
- Arab Artists, National Museum of Women in the Arts, Washington, 1994
- Egyptian Contemporary Art exhibition, Beirut, 1995
- Egyptian Artists, Beijing, 1994-1995
