= Clea Badaro =

Egyptian artist (1913–1968)

- Born: 1913; Cairo
- Died: 1968 (aged 54–55)

Clea Badaro (1913–1968) was an Egyptian painter and designer who lived most of her adult life in Alexandria, Egypt.

== Early life and education ==
Badaro was born in Cairo in 1913, on the island of Zamalek. After the death of her Greek mother, her father, who was a lawyer and business man, took his two daughters, Jeanne and Clea, to live with their maternal grandmother in Montreux, Switzerland.

Badaro attended school in Montreux until age sixteen and then enrolled at the Académie des Beaux Arts in Lausanne. There, she designed a number of posters, one of which she sold to Josephine Baker who was on tour in Switzerland at the time. In her final year, she was awarded the Grand Prix for her poster entitled L'Égypte, which was later acquired by the Egyptian Ministry of Communications. She graduated in about 1934.

== Career ==
Badaro returned to Egypt after graduation and settled in Alexandria. During the war years, she worked in the hospitals and canteens frequented by soldiers returning from battle in the northern desert. During that time, she painted scenes of sailors, bars, and soldiers in cabarets, some of which today can be found in Egyptian museums of modern art. She established a studio in the Atelier of Alexandria. She was introduced there to the British novelist Lawrence Durrell, who was posted in Alexandria during the war as press attaché for the British Foreign Office. Badaro sketched Durrell, and he, in turn, would later portray her as the character "Clea" in his tetralogy: The Alexandrian Quartet.

Badaro was commissioned to design posters for charity fairs and exhibitions, but most of these are no longer to be found. When the war was over, Badaro began a series of character portraits. Then, in 1948, she spent the summer in the Dolomites, where, unusually for her, she composed a number of landscape paintings. Badaro painted many Bedouin women and the Egyptian fellaheen, portraying their graceful gestures, proud deportment, and flowing clothes. She also painted mother and child portraits and nudes.

In 1950, Clea Badaro married the Alexandrian artist Giovanni di Pietro. She then took part in several national and international exhibitions, including the Biennale of Venice, the Biennale of Alexandria, and exhibitions in São Paulo, Moscow, Leningrad, Madrid, and Barcelona.

Badaro also sometimes portrayed cats; one such painting, La Chatte, won a prize at the Salon du Caire in 1958. Horses often appear in her circus compositions.

In 1959, Badaro mounted an exhibition at the Galerie Lutétia in Cairo and was praised for her portrayal of the human body by Jean Moscatelli in Le Journal d'Égypte.

In 1963, Badaro travelled to Ravenna, Italy, where she began to paint groups of Egyptian women against a gold background which she worked with a knife to create a mosaic impression. Later, these paintings were dubbed "icons" by the Parisian press. The art historian Hilde Zaloscer, who taught at the University of Alexandria, compared Clea Badaro's fellaheen with characters in Pietro Della Francesca's frescoes in Arezzo.

In 1961, Badaro's husband died and she herself experienced a decline in health. Her sister, Jeanne Engalytcheff-Badaro, began to spend more time in Alexandria, cared for her sister, helped to organize the Atelier's activities and wrote regular articles for its bulletin.

In 1969, the year following her sister's death, Jeanne Engalytcheff-Badaro organized a retrospective exhibition of her works at the Atelier of Alexandria: forty works were shown including oil and gouache paintings, pastels, brightly colored posters, charcoal and red chalk drawings. These exhibited many female characters: supplicants, weeping women, adolescents and tightrope walkers in bright light. In 1974, Engalytcheff-Badaro organized a retrospective exhibition of her sister's oil paintings, this time in Paris at the Galerie Weil.
