= Abdel Hadi Al Gazzar =

Egyptian painter

- عبد الهادي الجزار
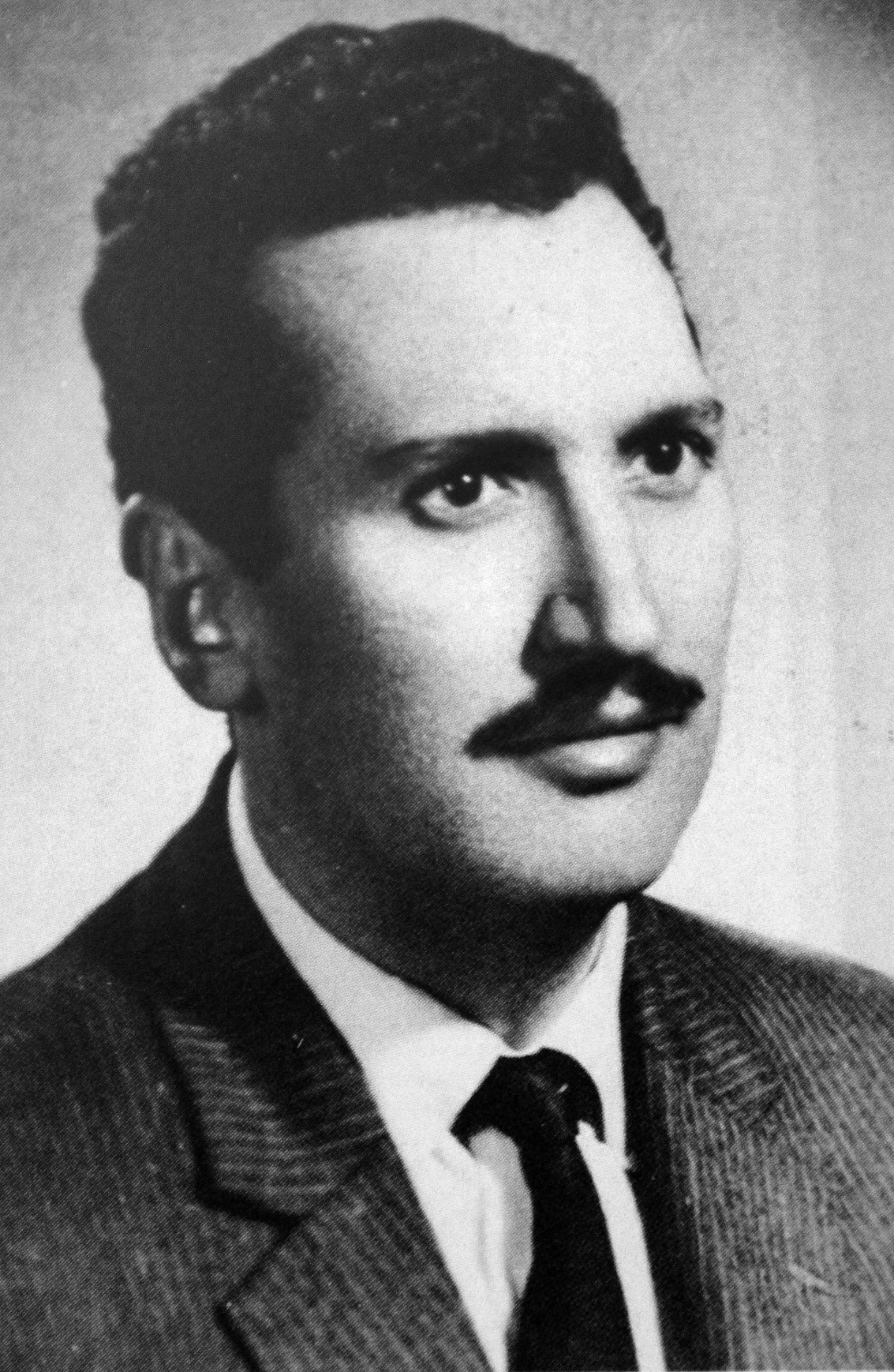
- Abdel Hadi Al Gazzar
- Born: March 14, 1925; Alexandria, Egypt
- Died: March 8, 1966 (aged 40)
- Education: Cairo School of Fine Arts
- Known for: Painting
- Notable work: (see list of works below)
- Movement: Contemporary Egyptian art

Abdel Hadi Al Gazzar (Arabic: عبد الهادي الجزار; 14 March 1925 – 8 March 1966) was an Egyptian painter. He occupies a unique position among the artists of his generation. His membership in the Contemporary Art Group elevated his status as an artist through his utilization of social commentary in addition to the group's focus on traditional, Egyptian identity. This commentary is most widely recognized in his painting, The High Dam, in which he comments on the effects of modernization by the Egyptian government on society and their way of life. Since his death, his work has not ceased to challenge artists, intellectuals and critics both in Egypt and abroad.

== Early life and education ==
Abdel Hady Mohammad El- Gazzar was born on March 14, 1925, in the Akkabri district in Alexandria; he was son of a Sheikh, a religious scholar. In 1940, his family moved to Cairo and settled in the district of Sayyida Zaynab.

At Helmiyya Secondary School, Al Gazzar attended courses at the 'artistic club’ organized by Hussein Youssef Amin, the founder of The Group of Contemporary Art, in 1944; this group constituted one of the major early attempts to ground Egyptian arts in its own culture. The artists embarked on a search for Egyptian traditions and applied folk symbols mixed with popular philosophy in order to rid Egypt's art of romantic and unrealistic traces left by the earlier Western Orientalist painters. In many ways the group drew upon their predecessor, the Art and Freedom Group—as with the continuation of the use of surrealism and abstraction. However, the Art and Freedom Group focused on the breakdown of Egyptian identity, which is where they differed. Al Gazzar was a member of this group, which included other Egyptian important artists such as Hamed Nada and Samir Rafi.

== Career ==
Before Al Gazzar discovered his passion for the arts and started attending the School of Fine Arts, he began studying for a career in Faculty of Medicine in Cairo. In 1950, Al Gazzar graduated from the Cairo School of Fine Arts, where he subsequently worked as an assistant professor. He had his first personal exhibition held at the Museum of Modern Egyptian Art in Cairo during the period December 17–24, 1951. Al Gazzar obtained two scholarships in Rome, Italy, in 1954 and in 1957. He obtained a diploma from the School of Art and Restoration of Rome. He visited schools of Fine Arts in England, France and Italy. In his early years, Al Gazzar's choice of medium was crayon or ink on paper, before moving to painting in his later years.

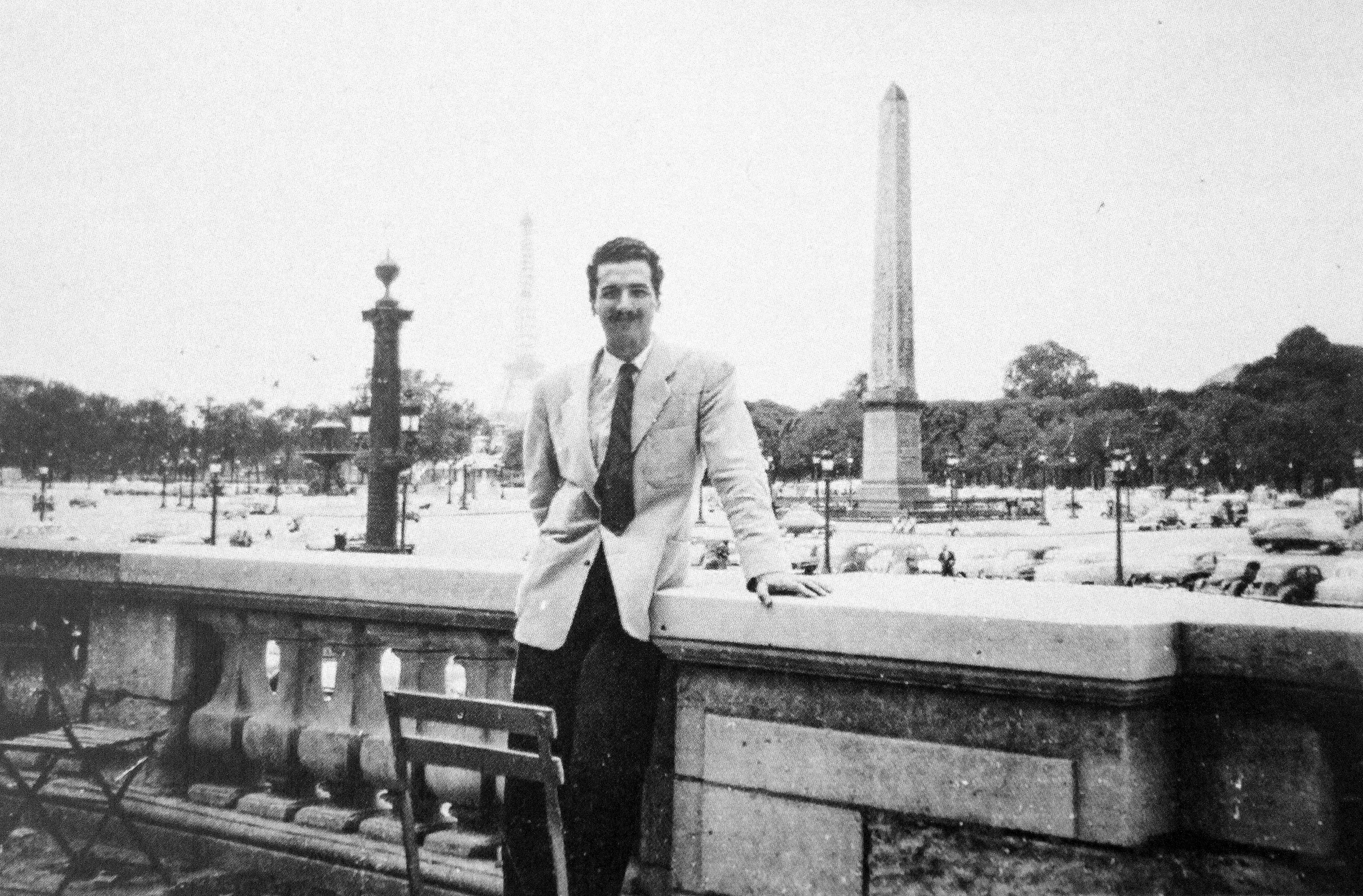
El Gazzar In Paris

From 1958 to 1965, Al Gazzar participated in many national and international exhibitions, winning several medals and prizes. At one Contemporary Art Group exhibition, he and his mentor, Hussein Youssef Amin, got arrested for the political commentary in their works. In 1965, shortly before his death, he participated for the second time in the Alexandria Biennial.

He died in 1966 due to a heart attack, he was 40 or 41 years old.

== Artwork ==
Al Gazzar tended to use oil paints on canvas in paper, as well as watercolor and ink, although he doesn't limit himself to just those media. Occasionally he indulged in some mixed media as well.

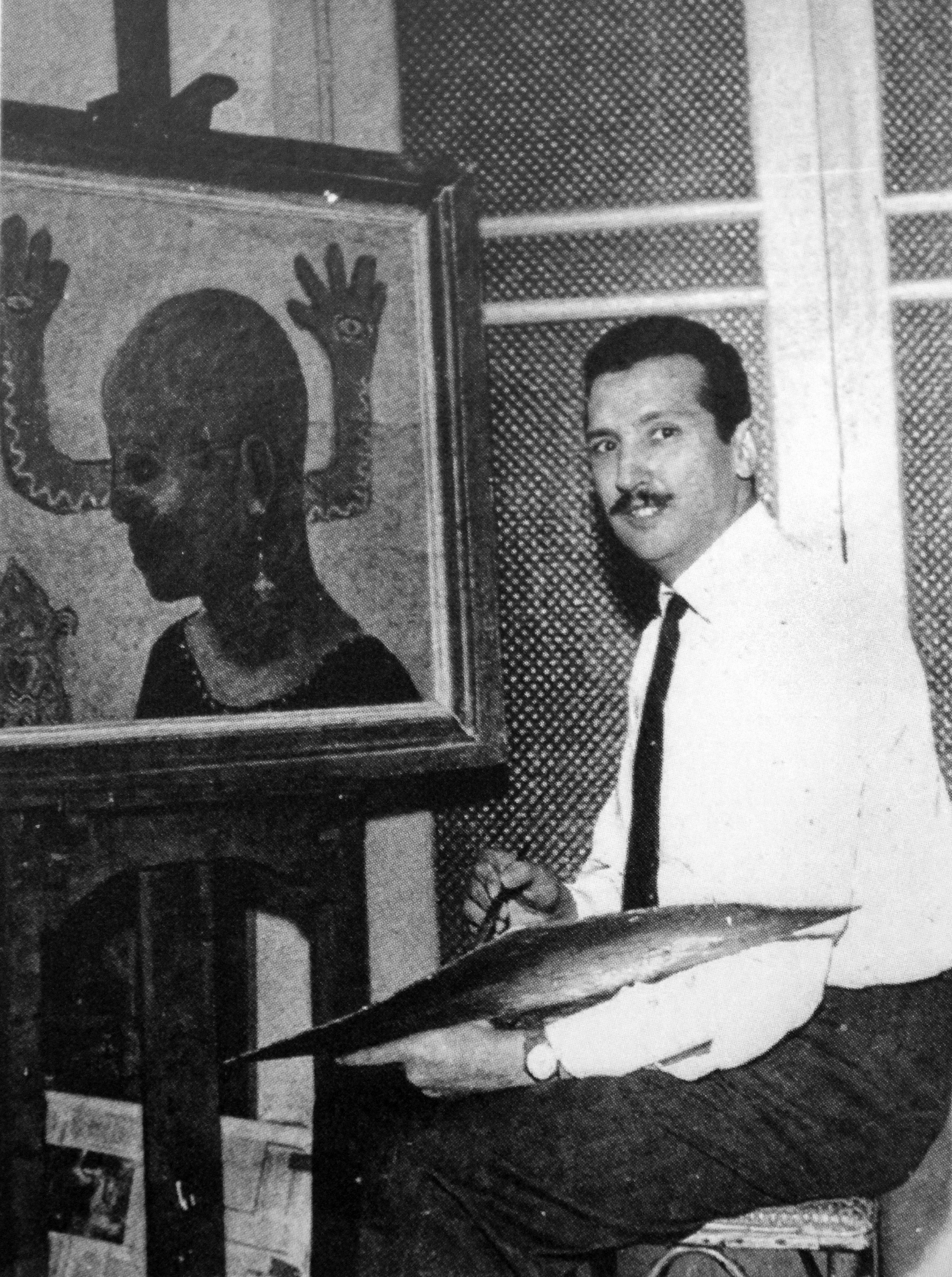
El Gazzar with The Green Fool painting

Some of his works include

- 1948, The world of shells
- 1951, The Green Fool
- 1951, An Ear of Mud, An Ear of Paste
- 1952, Word of Love
- 1955, Abstraction
- 1961, The Stanger's

Al Gazzar seems to have many untitled art pieces.

The most popular art piece of his is An Ear of Mud, An Ear of Paste. This piece was made with oil on paper. This art piece is a prime example of Al Gazzars artistic style and influence. He gets inspired by mystical, religious aspects of others and the world. His work often reflects social political issues that take place in Egypt .

== Legacy ==
One of his paintings titled "Inspired by the Red Sea Lighthouses" in 1964, was lost when it was on display on loan to the Egyptian Ministry of Culture in 1971. However, the art piece was found hanging in a coffee shop, and later retrieved to the Gezira Center for Modern Art in June 2022.

== Catalogue Raisonné ==
In 2023, a comprehensive two-volume catalogue raisonné titled ''El-Gazzar: The Complete Works'' was published by Norma Éditions in Paris. Co-authored by Valérie Didier and Dr. Hussam Rashwan in collaboration with the Abdel Hadi El-Gazzar Foundation, it marks a significant milestone in Middle Eastern art history as only the second catalogue raisonné ever published for an artist from the region.

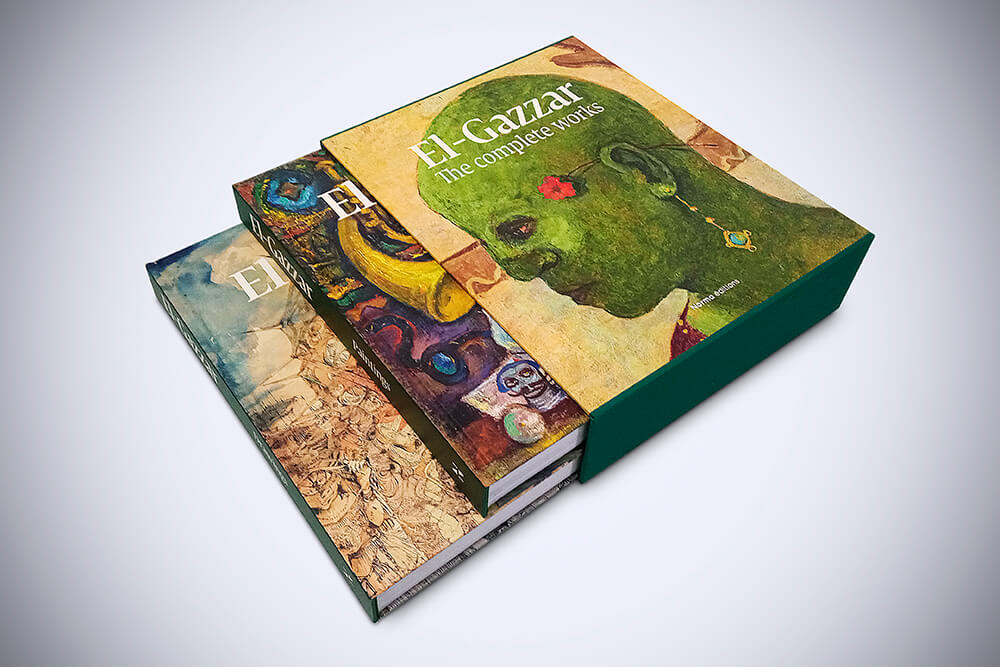
Abdel Hadi El Gazzar - The Complete Works

The publication documents 653 pages of the artist's output and is divided into two distinct volumes: [1, 2]

- Volume 1: Dedicated to the artist's paintings, including detailed studies of his "folk" and "popular" periods.
- Volume 2: Focuses on graphic works, archives, and photographs, providing a broader contextual understanding of his artistic evolution and the social landscape of modern Egypt.

The work includes contributions from various scholars, such as art critic Moustapha Eissa and art historian Samir Gharib, and features interviews with the artist’s widow, Laila Effat. It serves as a definitive tool for authentication and scholarly research into El-Gazzar’s transition from folkloric expressionism to industrial abstraction.

== Exhibitions ==
Some of the most important private and collective exhibitions:

- 1946, Contemporary Art Group Exhibition, Paris, France.
- 1946, Contemporary Art Group Exhibition, Bab Al Louk Licee’. Cairo, Egypt.
- 1948 Contemporar
- 1951, Modern Art Museum of Cairo, Egypt.
- 1953, Fine Arts Museum, Alexandria, Egypt.
- 1957, São Paulo Biennial, Brazil.
- 1957, Spring Exhibition, Cairo, Egypt.
- 1958, “Art in Fifty Years” International Exhibition, Brooklyn, USA.
- 1960, Venice Biennial, Italy.
- 1961, Alvolka Gallery, Rome, Italy.
- 1962, “The Revolution, Ten Years After” Art Competition, Cairo, Egypt.
- 1962, Fine Fans Society Exhibition, Cairo, Egypt.
- 1964, Cairo Saloon Exhibition, Egypt.
- 1965, Alexandria Biennial, Egypt.
- 1972, Contemporary Egyptian Art, Moscow, Russia.
- 1985, Mashrabiya Gallery, Cairo, Egypt.
- 1991, Portrait Art Exhibition, Cairo Opera Hall, Egypt.
- 1995, 70th Anniversary of Gazzar’s Birthday, Modern Art Museum of Cairo, Egypt.
- 2001, Safar Khan Gallery, Cairo, Egypt.
- 2003, Picasso Gallery, Cairo, Egypt.
- 2004, Creativity Gallery, Cairo, Egypt.

== Awards ==
- 1942: 1st Prize for Painting, Helmiyya Secondary School, Cairo, Egypt.
- 1945: 1st Prize for Photography, in the National Contest for Art Products Exhibition, Denshway, Egypt.
- 1957: Bronze Medal Award, São Paulo Biennial, Brazil
- 1958: 1st Prize for Mural Painting Design, Cairo Court Complex, Egypt.
- 1958: Silver Medal Award from the Italian city of Bari, Italy.
- 1958: Henry Moore Statue Prize, the International Exhibition "Fifty years of Arts", Brussels, Belgium.
- 1958: Silver Medal Award from the Italian city of Palermo, Italy.
- 1962: 1st Prize for his painting "The Charter", in the competition " The Revolution, Ten Years After ", Cairo, Egypt.
- 1963: 1st Prize, the 40th Cairo Salon, Egypt.
- 1964: Golden Medal Award, the 41st Cairo Salon, Egypt.
- 1964: Medal of Arts & Science and State Incentive Award for his painting "The High Dam". Egypt.
- 1964/1965: State Incentive Award in Photography, Cairo, Egypt.
- 1965: Full-time Grant Art, Ministry of Culture and National Guidance, Cairo, Egypt.
- 1966: 2nd Prize for Photography, Alexandria Biennial, Egypt.
- 1998: Medal Award by the Second Scientific Conference, Fine Arts Faculty, Helwan University, Cairo, Egypt.
- 2006: The Golden Feather by the 4th Honorary Exhibition for Artists, Cairo, Egypt.

== Writings ==
Folk Poems. Many Articles for "the Islamic Post Magazine". Two stories: "Barber's Shop" "Soul's Departure"

== Collections ==
State Collections

- Museum of the Modern Egyptian Art. Cairo, Egypt.
- Museum of Faculty of Fine Arts. Cairo, Egypt.
- Museum of Faculty of Fine Arts. Alexandria, Egypt.
- Port Said Museum. Egypt.
- Banha Museum. Egypt.
- The Arab Museum of Paris, France.
- Museum of New Delhi, India.

Private Collections

- Art Lovers Association. Cairo, Egypt.

== Bibliography ==
- Sobhy Al Sharouny :"Abdel Hadi AlGazzar: The Strangers", Copyright Dr. Sobhy Al Sharouny. 1961.
- Sobhy Al Sharouny: "Abdel Hadi Al Gazzar the Artist of the Legend and Space World", National Publication House. 1966.
- Badr El Din Abu Ghazi: "Generations of Pioneers", Publications of Fine Arts Fans Society. 1975.
- Ezz El Din Naguib: "Modern Egyptian Art Dawn", Beirut, Arab Future House. 1982.
- Samia Mehrez: "Abdel Hadi al-Gazzar: an Egyptian Painter", translation from Arabic to English of the poetry by and about the Egyptian painter Al Gazzar in a collective, trilingual volume on his life and work. Dar al Mustaqbal al Arabi. 1990. pp. 28–45.
- Alain and Christine Roussillon: " Egyptian Painter Abdel Hadi Al Gazzar", Arab Future Publication House. 1990.
- Samir Gharib: "Surrealism in Egypt", General Egyptian Book Authority. 1996.
- Sherifa Zuhur: "Colors of Enchantment: Theater, Dance, Music, and the Visual Arts of the Middle East", AUC Press. 1998.(Modern Painting in the Mashriq, Hussein, 1989, p. 37).
- Sabri Mansour: "Plastic Studies: Series of Plastic and Prospects", General Authority of Cultural Palaces. 2000.
- Liliane Karnouk: "Modern Egyptian Art 1910-2003", AUC Press, 2003.
- Venetia Porter: "Arab artists' appropriation of modernity", British Museum Press. 2006.
- Sobhy Al-Sharouny, Abdel Hadi Al-Gazzar, Cairo, 2007 (illustrated in colour, p. 89).
