= Susan Hefuna =

German-Egyptian artist (born 1962)

- Born: 1962 (age 63–64); Berlin, Germany
- Website: susanhefuna.com

Susan Hefuna (Arabic: سوزان حفونه) is a German-Egyptian visual artist. She works in a variety of media, including drawing, photography, sculpture, installation, video and performance. She lives and works between Cairo, Egypt, and Germany.

== Early life and education ==
Hefuna was born in Berlin, Germany, in 1962 to an Egyptian father and a German mother. Hefuna spent the first eight years of her life in Egypt, and later moved to Graz, Austria, to be closer to her mother's family. In 1992, she attained a post-graduate degree from the Institute for New Media at the Städelschule in Frankfurt, Germany, under Peter Weibel.

Hefuna connects her Egyptian and German roots in her work, using the urban imagery, typography and traditions of both to build a bridge between the two cultures.

== Work ==
Hefuna's drawings generally employ Indian ink for works consisting of more than one layer; for works of a single layer she usually uses watercolor.

A recurring theme in her work is the mashrabiya screen, the wooden or stone lattice-work screen that features in traditional Egyptian architecture.

These screens first appeared in Hefuna's drawings in 1990 and her photographs taken with a pinhole camera. In 2008 Hefuna had a solo exhibition of her work, entitled On the Edgware Road, at the Serpentine Galleries, which drew heavily from the recent Arab Spring uprisings. In 2009 around 300 of her ink and pencil drawings on layered tracing paper were exhibited in the Giardini and the Arsenale venues at Fare Mondi, at the 53rd Venice Biennale. Her projects are documented in the Trilogy Pars Pro Toto by editor Hans Ulrich Obrist published by Kehrer.

== Exhibitions ==
Hefuna's work was shown on several occasions in the UK: starting at Bluecoat Gallery in Liverpool (2004), and with Rose Issa Projects (2008-2014) in 2014 in the "Here and Elsewhere" exhibition at the New Museum in New York. Her work has also been exhibited at the Sharjah Biennale, in the Townhouse Gallery in Cairo, and in venues in London, Brussels, Vienna, Beirut, Dubai and Istanbul.

== Criticism ==
In a review of Hefuna's exhibition, "Navigation X Cultural," at the South African National Gallery in Cape Town, Tracy Murinik said, "Hefuna articulates a complex web of physical references in her construction of this immense and quite astonishing palmwood structure," and praised her "immaculately dense drawings" and "bold digital prints and photographs."

== Awards ==
In 1998, Hefuna was awarded the International Award at the Cairo Biennial. In 2013 she was awarded the Contemporary Drawing Prize by the Daniel and Florence Guerlain Foundation in Paris.

== Art market ==
Hefuna is currently represented by Pi Artworks in London and Istanbul and the Rhona Hoffman Gallery in Chicago.
