= Nadia Sirry =

Egyptian artist (born 1958)

- Born: 1958; Cairo

Nadia Baher Sirry (Arabic: نادية سري) is a Cairo-born painter of Turkish-Lebanese descent, born in 1958.

== Life ==
Sirry is a graduate of Ain Shams University. She worked for a time at the British Institute in Egypt before devoting herself full-time to her artistic career. She currently lives and works in Cairo.

=== Membership ===
- Member of the Syndicate of Plastic Arts.

=== Private exhibitions ===
- Cairo Opera House (Salah Taher Hall) exhibition (The Feather) December 2015

International Exhibitions:

- The traveling Gallery of the Intercontinental Biennial of Indigenous – Millenarian Art in Toronto Canada – June 2013
- The Fifth Intercontinental Biennial of Indigenous Millenarian Art in Quito Ecuador August 2014
- Traveling Gallery "Recreando El Planeta" coordinated by IR-MANO Artistas Latinoamericanos Brazil and the Ministry of exterior affairs in Uruguay held at Santos Palace, Montevideo Uruguay November 2014.

=== Local Awards ===
- Honored and awarded a certificate of appreciation from the Minister of Culture and the Director of Fine Arts Sector 2012 and 2015.
- Honored by The Egyptian Arts Preservation Society 2015.
- Honored by The National Society of Fine Arts 2015.

=== International Awards ===
- Special Award in Watercolor Painting from the Fourth Intercontinental Biennial of Indigenous- Millenarian Art - October 2012
- First Award in Painting from at the Fifth Intercontinental Biennial of Indigenous-Millenarian Art – August 2014.
