= Aya Tarek =

Egyptian street artist (born 1990)

Aya Tarek آية طارق
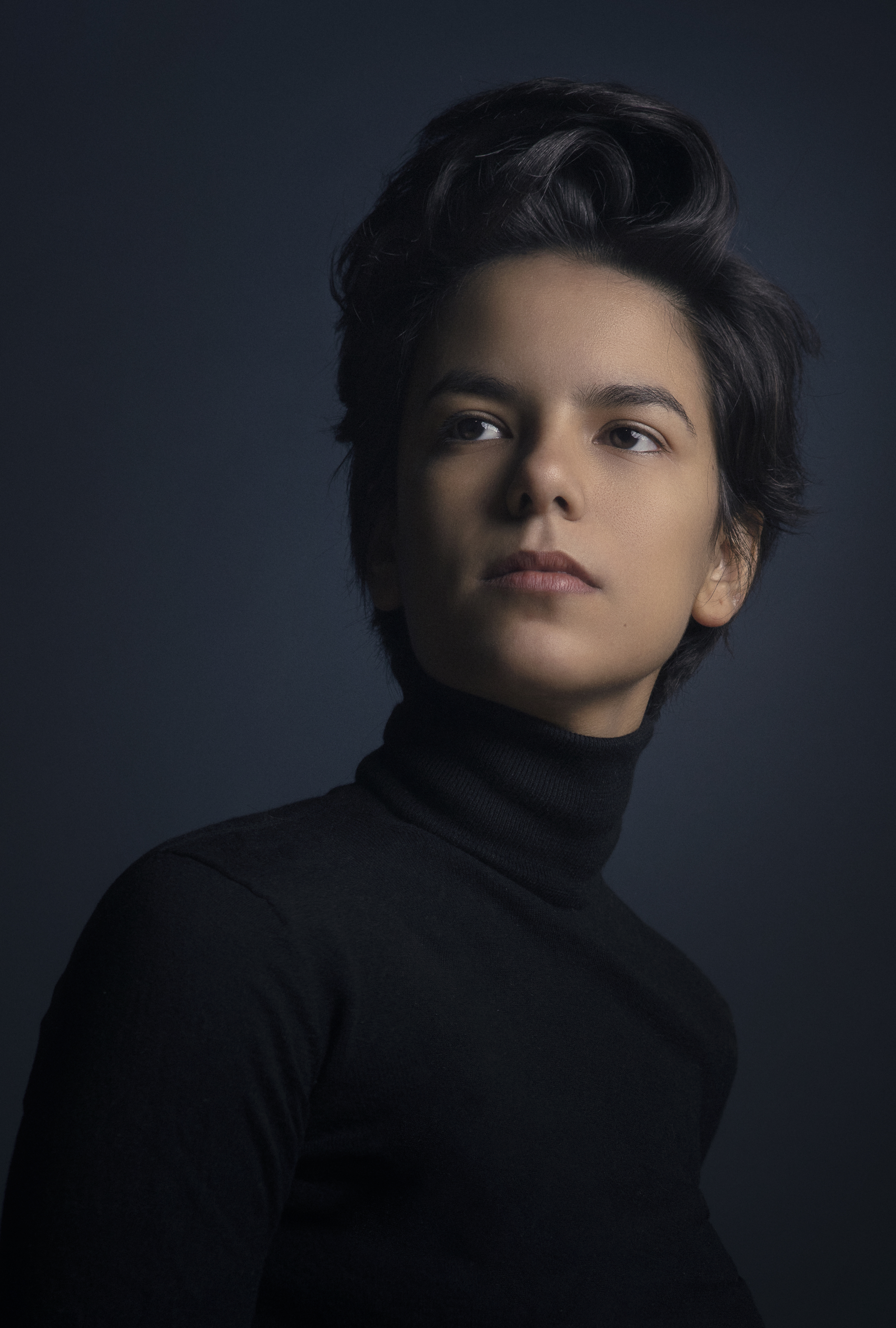
- Born: Aya Tarek Hassan; November 14, 1990 (age 35); Alexandria, Egypt
- Education: Alexandria University
- Occupation: Artist
- Website: www.ayatarek.com

Aya Tarek (Arabic: آية طارق) is an Egyptian artist from the city of Alexandria. Tarek's mediums are primarily street art or graffiti and paint. Although street art in Egypt gained much international attention after the 2011 revolution, Tarek began sharing her street art on the walls of Alexandria in 2008, when she was 18.

== Life ==
Tarek, born on November 14, 1989, began working in publicity and advertising for various companies. She attended Alexandria University, where she specialized in oil painting but found the fine art classes too restrictive. As a result, in 2008, she began experimenting with graffiti as a more expressive outlet. Tarek inherited her grandfather's studio located in downtown Alexandria where she established the first graffiti artist group in the city. The studio known as the Art Establishment, was where Tarek along with a group of friends experimented with graffiti, comic book art, muralism, and multimedia. Struggling to get her work into galleries, Tarek took her art to the streets.

Tarek's grandfather was a graphic designer and cinema poster artist in the 1960s and was said to be her main source of inspiration, she stated, "I'm totally inspired by his work. We have the same brush."

== Career ==
Tarek initially began producing street art due to difficulty accessing traditional galleries. At the time, street art was not popular and usually frowned upon. Tarek, however, states that gender was never an issue when she first started her graffiti work.

By 2009, Tarek had already created several street-art pieces and started to make an appearance in independent films. She was in a film by Ahmed Abdallah called Microphone, which explores Alexandria's art scene leading up to the 2011 revolution

One of Tarek's earliest political works was a collaborative graffiti piece with multidisciplinary designer and artist Mohamed Gaber, featuring a fist alongside the words "Be with Art."

In the fall of 2012, Tarek participated in an exhibition in Beirut called White Wall. The exhibit was organized by the Beirut Art Center in partnership with Foundation Saradar and featured an exhibit at the Beirut Art Center and works displayed on the streets of Beirut. In the same year, Tarek was featured in episode eleven of the documentary series Women from the Egyptian Revolution, where she discussed the impact of the revolution on graffiti art in Egypt. She described pre-revolution graffiti as open to interpretation and artistic experimentation, stating, "The graffiti we used to do before the revolution was open to any subject, and it was open for experimentation in different techniques." Tarek further explained that during and in the years after the revolution, graffiti in Cairo became predominantly stencil-based and politically driven, limiting artistic individuality and personal expression.

== Recognition ==
In November 2024, she received the 20th UNESCO-Sharjah Prize for Arab Culture along filmmaker Alidji Alvin, making her the youngest woman to receive this prize in the culture category.

== See also ==
- Contemporary Art in Egypt
