= Heba Amin =

Egyptian artist (born 1980)

Heba Y. Amin
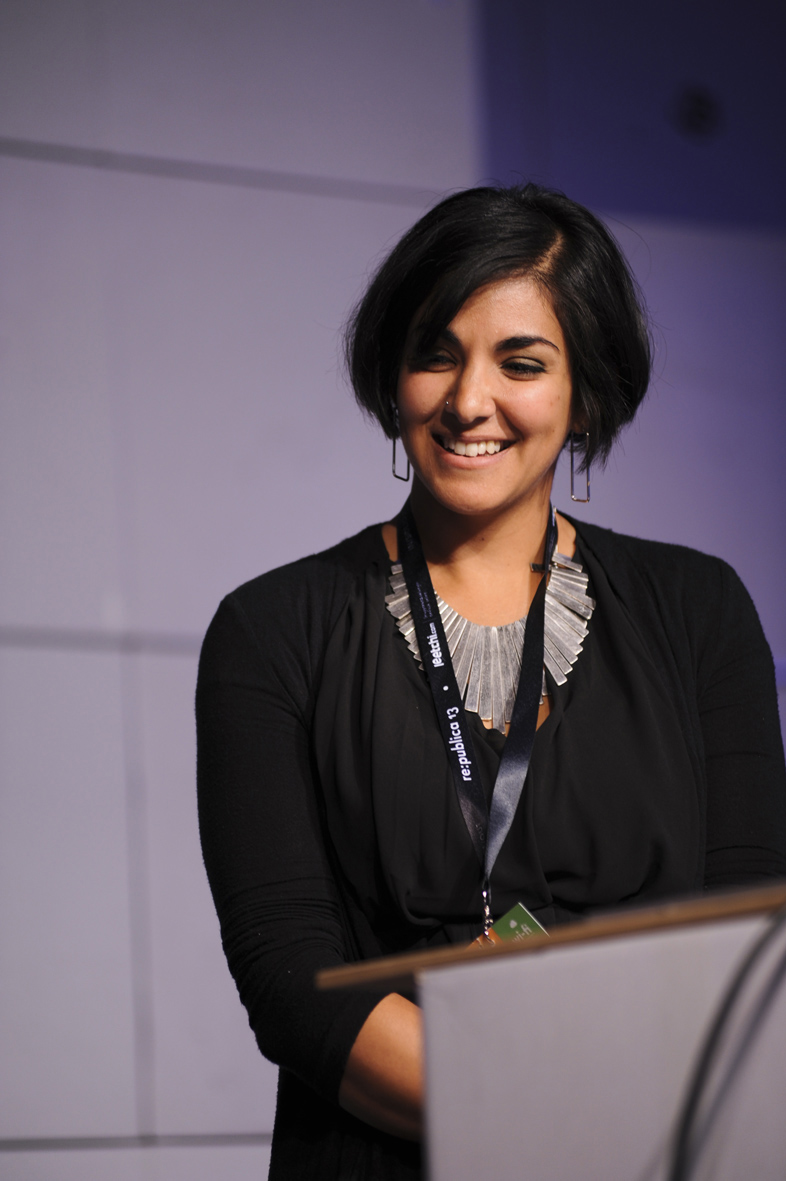
- Amin speaking at re:publica in 2013
- Born: 1980 (age 45–46); Cairo, Egypt
- Education: Macalester College (BA); University of Minnesota (MFA)
- Website: Official website

Heba Y. Amin (born 1980) is a visual artist, researcher and educator.

== Early life and education ==
Amin was born and raised in Cairo. She was educated at Cairo American College in Maadi. Amin moved to the United States in 1998 and studied Mathematics and Studio Art receiving a BA diploma from Macalester College. She enrolled in a post-graduate program at the Minneapolis College of Art and Design in 2005. She received an MFA in interactive design from the College of Design at the University of Minnesota in 2009. Following her studies, she was awarded a DAAD (German Academic Exchange) grant for her project "Alternative Memorials" at the University of Applied Sciences, Berlin. She is a DCRL Fellow in Leuphana University in Lüneburg (2017), a doctoral fellow in at BGSMSC at Freie Universität in Berlin from 2016 to present, and a current Field of Vision fellow in NYC.

== Career ==
Amin's works are embedded in extensive research and interrogating the convergence of politics, technology, and urbanism. She is currently the curator of Visual Art for Mizna (Minneapolis, USA), curator for the biennial residency program DEFAULT with Random Association (IT) (Italy) and co-founder of the Black Athena Collective along with artist Dawit L. Petros. She is also one of the artists behind the subversive action on the set of the television series "Homeland" which received worldwide media attention.

Hired by the producers of the Homeland television series to incorporate "authentic" Arabic graffiti, Amin spray-painted subversive graffiti on the set of the show. Written in Arabic, the graffiti actually criticized the show Homeland itself, with phrases such as "Homeland is racist". Amin has criticized Homeland for its inaccuracy and bias in its portrayal of people from various countries in the Middle East.

Amin illustrated a children's book Extraordinary Women in the Muslim World; the book received a Moonbeam Children's Book Award.

Amin has taken part in group exhibitions at the Dak'Art Biennale 2016, Marakkech Biennale Parallel Projects 2016, Museum of Modern Art in Warsaw, the Kunstverein in Hamburg, Camera Austria, Berlin Berlinale 9th Forum Expanded Exhibition, the IV Moscow International Biennale for Young Art, the WRO 15th Media Art Biennale Poland, the National Gallery of Mongolia, and the Art Museum of Gotland Sweden. She has received a DAAD (Deutscher Akademischer Austausch Dienst) grant and a Rhizome commission grant and was shortlisted for the artraker prize.

Amin taught at the University of Minnesota, American University in Cairo, and the University of Applied Sciences in Berlin. She has given various lectures and workshops worldwide. Her work titled The Earth Is an Imperfect Ellipsoid (2016) was featured in Mizna 's Summer'16 Issue, where she was also interviewed in Lana Barkawi's essay "Criticality and Dissent". Currently, Amin is appointed as a professor of digital and time-based art at ABK Stuttgart.

Amin currently lives in Berlin and works as a lecturer at Bard College Berlin.
