= Nermine Hammam =

Egyptian artist (born 1967)

- Born: 1967 (age 57–58); Cairo, Egypt
- Occupations: Photographer, graphic designer, film production, branding
- Known for: Photography, digital collage

Nermine Hammam (born 1967) is an Egyptian photographer, who lives and works in Cairo and London. She is known for her digital photo collage.

== Early life and education ==
She was born in 1967 in Cairo, and later moved to England and then the United States in 1985. She received a BFA degree in film-making from the Tisch School of the Arts in New York City.

== Career ==
She worked in film with Simon & Goodman and then with Egyptian director Youssef Chahine. She was a production assistant on the 1992 Spike Lee film Malcolm X. Hammam subsequently worked as a graphic designer before moving on to visual arts and photography.

As a female photographer, Hammam said she "entered this traditionally male-dominated space, camera in hand, inverting conventional power relationships to ‘shoot’ the soldiers. Their response to my presence, as a woman, in their midst, has become part of the ‘facts’ documented in these images.”

Hammam is known for the distinctive technique with which she reworks photography, addressing the influence of mass media and market stylization. Her layered, digitally manipulated works explore the subjective nature of reality. As the founder and creative director of Equinox Graphics, Hammam is also known for introducing art into the public space through innovative design and branding. She is behind some of Egypt’s most familiar brands, including Cilantro Café, Diwan Bookstores and the Deyafa group of restaurants and bars.

Her work has been included in solo and group exhibitions in Egypt, France, Italy, the United Kingdom, Denmark, the United States, Kuwait and Singapore. Hammam's work is included in the collections of the Victoria and Albert Museum in London, the Tropenmuseum in Amsterdam and the Parco Horcynus Orca in Italy.

Over the past decade, her work has been shown in more than seventy-five international exhibitions with over 7 exhibitions in the UK alone. Her work has been featured in over 50 publications and written about in the magazines such as Newsweek (USA), the Financial Times (UK), and The Times (UK).

In her London exhibition "Cairo Year One", Hammam used the style of traditional Japanese painting to present violent scenes from the Egyptian Revolution of 2011. "Cairo Year One" featured ten photographs from "Upekkha" (2011), the first part of the “Cairo Year One” series, and two photographs from later works in the series, “Unfolding” (2012). Hammam juxtaposed images of soldiers in Tahrir Square during the uprising with peaceful scenes from her personal collection of postcards. “This work is about youth, universal youth, and the harshness and inhumanity of sending our children to war”, said Hammam. Inspired by propaganda posters from the 1940s and ’50s depicting strong figures in idealized settings, Hammam said, “the backgrounds emphasize the discordant presence of armed men among civilians in Tahrir: men of war in Paradise.”

Hammam received a 2011 Freedom to Create award (first prize); a 2011 Worldwide Photography Gala Award (first prize); a 2012 Julia Margaret Cameron Award (honorable mention); a 2010 Jacob Riis Award (runner-up); and was a 2010 Invisible World Portfolio Selection finalist (honorable mention).
