= Lara Baladi =

Egyptian-Lebanese photographer (born 1969)

- Born: 1969 (age 56–57); Beirut, Lebanon
- Known for: Photography, Installation, Film, Curator

Lara Baladi (born 1969 in Beirut, Lebanon) is an acclaimed Egyptian-Lebanese photographer, archivist and multimedia artist. She was educated in Paris and London and currently lives in Cairo. Baladi exhibits and publishes worldwide. Her body of work encompasses photography, video, visual montages/collages, installations, architectural constructions, tapestries, sculptures and even perfume. Much of her work reflects her "concerns with Egypt's extremely alarming sociopolitical context."

== Work ==
Since 1997, she has been a member of the Arab Image Foundation (AIF), for which she directs magazine editorials and curates exhibitions and artist residencies. She curated the artist residency Fenenin el Rehal (Nomadic Artists) in Egypt's White Desert in 2006 and participated in workshops and conferences around the world. Baladi is represented by the Townhouse Gallery of Contemporary Art in Cairo and Gallery Isabelle van den Eynde (IVDE Gallery) in Dubai. Baladi received a Japan Foundation Fellowship in 2003 to research manga and anime in Tokyo. Among other global locations, she participated in the VASL residency program in Karachi, Pakistan in 2010. The breadth and variety of Baladi’s international experience influences her use of iconography drawn from numerous cultures.

=== Photo-montage ===
In 2000, she participated in The Desert, a group exhibition at Fondation Cartier in Paris with Om El Dounia (Mother of the World), a vast mosaic of photographs with highly saturated colors. This piece, while playful and with many references to pop culture, is also an exploration of the Biblical story of creation.

In 2007, Baladi presented a work called Justice for the Mother, which depicts leaders of Arab countries. She considers it part of a series she calls "anthropological photography," where she assembles series of photographs that tell a larger story. In this piece, Baladi draws from influences from both Western and Islamic traditions, creating "fantastical, playful surveys of history, culture and personal reflection."

Sandouk el Dounia (The World in a Box), is a huge composition of hundreds of scanned photographs. The name of the piece references traditional street theater for children in Cairo. Sandouk was presented in 2009 at the Queens Museum of Art's group exhibition Tarjama/Translationand in 2011 at the Venice Biennial's group show Penelope’s Labor: Weaving Words and Images. Reviewers called it "a giant tapestry version of a photo collage packed with images of action heroines".

=== Installations ===
An enormous installation titled "Al Fanous el Sehryn" (the Magic Lantern) was shown at the Townhouse Gallery in Cairo in 2003. The work consists of "a large eight-pointed star constructed of steel--approximately 23 feet in diameter--and a series of light boxes containing saturated colored images produced from x-ray photographs of a pregnant doll giving birth". The art suggests a cyclical nature where the images of the doll endlessly grow up and then giving birth over and over. The star shape was inspired by the chandeliers which hang in the mosque of Mohammed Ali in the Cairo Citadel.

Her installation Roba Vecchia was presented in 2006 at the Townhouse Gallery in Cairo, in 2007 at the Sharjah Biennal and in 2009 at Arabesques, an exhibition of Arab contemporary art at the Kennedy Center in Washington and described as a "human-scale kaleidoscope", that "incorporated images from pop culture, then shattered them in constantly changing geometries", and in which "the participant becomes immersed in a psychedelic environment where rapidly yet systematically changing imagery engulfs the viewer".

Borg el Amal (Tower of Hope), an ephemeral construction and sound installation, won the Grand Nile Award at the 2008/2009 Cairo Biennale. The inspiration for the tower comes from the slums surrounding Cairo known as ashwa'iyat (haphazard things). Her own tower in Borg el Amal was constructed of similar materials to the ashwa'iyat and allowed the audience to experience music under the oper sky. The entire installation is a challenge to "the censorship of the Mubarak era and addressed the state's ignorance of [that social plight]," which Baladi saw as a problem which she likened to a "ticking bomb about to explode." She commissioned the Kyiv Kamera Orchestra to perform the Donkey Symphony, Borg el Amal’s sound component, at the first Kyiv Biennial in 2012.

Coffee cups, presented in 2010 at Gallery Isabelle van den Eynde in Dubai has been considered both "playful" and inviting the viewer "into a world of contemplation and reflection".

=== Tahrir ===
During the Egyptian Revolution of 2011, Baladi co-founded two media initiatives: Radio Tahrir and Tahrir Cinema. Both projects were inspired and informed by the eighteen days that toppled Egyptian leader, Hosni Mubarak’s, leadership.

Radio Tahrir came about when Baladi and her friends, along with other like-minded people, started importing the equipment needed to start a pirate radio station. Radio Tahrir was the first free online radio in Egypt.

Tahrir Cinema was co-founded with Mosireen, an Egyptian non-profit media initiative. The project served as a public platform to build and share a video archive on and for the revolution. The impetus to create Tahrir Cinema came from the chaos surrounding the second sit-in in Tahrir: "People were screaming and shouting on stages into microphones," she says, "there was so much diffused information floating around, but no focus." Her training as a visual artist helped her organize, show and share documents relating to the revolution using these platforms.

Tahrir Cinema went live on July 14, 2011. The public experienced Tahrir Cinema as film shown on a screen constructed of wood and plastic in the main thoroughfare of the square. Surrounding the screen were rugs for people to sit on and areas for a larger standing crowd to view the footage. Lara Baladi created a collection of footage that included videos shot by activists directly involved in the revolution. She was very broad in her collecting, even showing "solidarity protests" from London. Being able to view and experience images and video taken by citizens in Egypt was an abrupt break with Mubarak's regime, where photography was prohibited in many areas of Egypt. Baladi writes, "people in the square took photos because they felt the social responsibility to do so...The camera became a nonviolent weapon aimed directly at the state, denouncing it."

=== Continuing work ===
Baladi received a Fellowship from the Massachusetts Institute of Technology's (MIT) Open Documentary Lab for 2014 and 2015 in order to research, archive and create a transmedia activism project called Vox Populi, Archiving a Revolution in the Digital Age. Vox Populi is a multimedia documentary that consists of an archive of articles, images and videos that Baladi had been gathering since January 25, 2011. Preserving the ephemera and the images of the revolution in Tahrir is important to Baladi. She writes that "most of the images of the 18 days [of protest] vanishing into a bottomless pit thanks to Google's PageRank algorithm, will the vision of a possible new world people glimpsed in [Tahrir] Square die along with its digital traces?" This expression of the fleeting nature of the digital world informs her current work.

== Selected solo exhibitions ==
2015 Perspectives, Arthur M. Sackler Gallery, Washington, DC, USA

2011 Hope, NY Abu Dhabi University Gallery, New York City, NY, USA

2010 Diary of the Future, Gallery Isabelle Van Den Eynde, Dubai, UAE

2008 Surface of Time, B21 Art Gallery, Dubai, UAE

2006 Towards the Light, 20 screen projections along one kilometer of the seashore on opening night of Image of the Middle

East Festival, Copenhagen International Theatre, Denmark

Roba Vecchia, Townhouse Gallery of Contemporary Art, Cairo, Egypt

2004-6 Kai’ro Lansmuseet, Vasternorrland, Harnosand, Sweden, 2005-6 Nikolai, Copenhagen Contemporary Art Centre, Denmark, 2005 Pori Museum, Pori, Finland, 2005

Bilmuseet, Umea, Sweden, 2004

2002 Al Fanous Al Sehry, Townhouse Gallery of Contemporary Art, Cairo, Egypt

2001 Sandouk Al Dounia

El Nitaq Festival, Cairo, Egypt Ashkal Alwan, Beirut, Lebanon
