= Bidoun =

Nonprofit magazine in the USA

- Predecessor: Bidoun Magazine
- Type: arts and culture non-profit organization
- Headquarters: United States

Bidoun Magazine
- Categories: Art and culture
- First issue: Spring 2004
- Final issue: Spring 2013
- Country: United States
- Language: English
- Website: www.bidoun.org
- ISSN: 1551-4048

Bidoun is a non-profit organization focused on art and culture from the Middle East and its diasporas. Bidoun was founded as a print publication and magazine in 2004 by Lisa Farjam, eventually expanding to online publishing and curatorial projects. The print edition of the magazine was in publication from spring 2004 until spring 2013.

== Magazine ==
The word "bidoun" in both Arabic and Persian means “without” in English. It is commonly mispronounced and confused with the word Bedouin.

Bidoun was a finalist for the 2009 National Magazine Award for General Excellence (circulation category less than 100k). It has won three Utne Independent Press Awards, for Social/Cultural Coverage and Design.

== Magazine contributors ==
Notable contributors to the magazine include: Etel Adnan, Tirdad Zolghadr, Pankaj Mishra, Binyavanga Wainaina, Lina Attalah, Eyal Weizman, Haytham el-Wardany, Tony Shafrazi, Jace Clayton, Thomas Keenan, Naeem Mohaiemen, Yto Barrada, Bruce Hainley, Hampton Fancher, Gini Aldaheff, Elizabeth Rubin, Yasmine El Rashidi, Shirana Shahbazi, Hassan Khan, Akram Zaatari, Michael Rakowitz, Natascha Sadr Haghighian, Elias Muhanna, William E Jones, Rokni Haerizadeh, Christopher Hitchens, Shumon Basar, Farhad Moshiri, Lawrence Weiner, Mohamed Mrabet, Slavs and Tatars, George Pendle, Wayne Koestenbaum, Issandr El Amrani, Fatima Al Qadiri, Sophia Al Maria, Ahdaf Soueif, Gary Dauphin, Kai Friese, Sharifa Rhodes-Pitts, Paul Chan, Anna Boghiguian, Lynne Tillman, Haris Epaminonda, Iman Issa, Ken Okiishi, Fawwaz Traboulsi, Achal Prabhala, Youssef Rakha, Sahar Mandour, Lawrence Osborne, Lina Mounzer, Rasha Salti, Okwui Enwezor, Namwali Serpell, Robyn Creswell, and Christopher de Bellaigue.

As of 2024, the editors of Bidoun are Negar Azimi, Michael C. Vazquez, Tiffany Malakooti, and Anna Della Subin. Babak Radboy is Bidoun's longtime Creative Director. The contributing editors of Bidoun are Alexander Provan, Anand Balakrishnan, Aram Moshayedi, Kaelen Wilson-Goldie, Shumon Basar, Zain Khalid, Sohrab Mohebbi, Sophia Al Maria, Yasmine El Rashidi, Sukhdev Sandhu, Yasmine Seale, and Elizabeth Wiet.

== Curatorial Projects ==
The Bidoun Library Project is an itinerant exhibition that “documents the innumerable ways that people have depicted and defined — that is, slandered, celebrated, obfuscated, hyperbolized, ventriloquized, photographed, surveyed, and/or exhumed — the vast, vexed, nefarious construct known as ‘the Middle East.’" The Bidoun Library, which consists of roughly 3,000 books and periodicals, has been exhibited in Pittsburgh at the Carnegie International, in New York at the New Museum, in London at the Serpentine Galleries, in Cyprus at the Point Centre for Contemporary Art, in Beirut at 98weeks, in Cairo at The Townhouse Gallery, in Stockholm at the Tensta Konsthall, in Abu Dhabi at Abu Dhabi Art, and in Dubai at Art Dubai.

In 2009, Bidoun organized the group exhibition 'NOISE' at Sfeir–Semler gallery in Beirut featuring Vartan Avakian, Steven Baldi, Walead Beshty, Haris Epaminonda, Media Farzin, Marwan, Yoshua Okon, Babak Radboy, Bassam Ramlawi, Mounira Al Solh, Andree Sfeir, Rayyane Tabet, Lawrence Weiner, and Alessandro Balteo Yazbeck. That same year Bidoun initiated a collaboration with the web-based archive UbuWeb in order to make available rare video and sound pieces from in and around the Middle East.

'Forms of Compensation' was a 2010 exhibition of a series of 21 reproductions of iconic modern and contemporary artworks produced in Cairo by craftspeople and auto mechanics in the neighborhood around the Townhouse Gallery, commissioned by Babak Radboy and overseen by Ayman Ramadan.

In 2015, Bidoun occupied a booth at the Frieze Art Fair in New York where it exhibited and sold insignificant objects from artists. Inspired by the celebrity collectibles market, where a Justin Bieber hairball sold at auction for $40,668, Bidoun extended this covetous logic to the rarified realm of art, proffering such miscellanies as Jeremy Deller's iPod Mini, Lawrence Weiner's gold tooth, Hans-Ulrich Obrist’s abused passport, and a 1638 edition of Burton’s The Anatomy of Melancholy defaced by Orhan Pamuk. Other items included Tony Shafrazi’s prescription drugs, a rock signed by Robert Smithson, Douglas Gordon’s house keys, Yto Barrada’s third grade report card, Hal Foster’s breath mints, Cindy Sherman’s eyeliner, Tala Madani’s body lotion, Wade Guyton’s Nikes, Anicka Yi’s brain, Julie Mehretu’s golf ball, Bjarne Melgaard’s Christmas card from a serial killer, Laura Owens’ bus pass, Shirin Neshat’s kohl, a stuffed animal once owned by the great Iranian modernist Bahman Mohasses, and Darren Bader’s junk mail.

In 2016, Bidoun programmed a screening series at the Solomon R. Guggenheim Museum, organized by Tiffany Malakooti.

Bidoun has staged exhibitions around the life and work of the late avant-garde theater director Reza Abdoh at MoMA PS1 in 2018 and KW Institute of Contemporary Art in 2019. These were co-organized by Klaus Biesenbach, Director, MoMA PS1 and Chief Curator at Large, The Museum of Modern Art; Kirst Gruijthuijsen, Director, KW Institute for Contemporary Art, and Negar Azimi, Tiffany Malakooti, and Babak Radboy for Bidoun.

In 2023, Negar Azimi and Edwin Nasr organized the exhibition Nicolas Moufarrege: Mutant International at CCA Berlin that ran from February 9 to March 25.

== Publications ==
=== Books ===
Bidoun has edited, published and co-published several books including:

- WITH/WITHOUT Spatial Products, Practices and Politics in the Middle East, Edited by Shumon Basar, Antonia Carver and Markus Miessen (Bidoun/Moutamarat, 2007) ISBN 978-9948-03-453-7
- Provisions | Sharjah Biennial 9: Book 1, Edited by Antonia Carver, Valerie Grove and Lara Khaldi (Bidoun/Sharjah Art Foundation, 2009) ISBN 978-9948-04-607-2
- Provisions | Sharjah Biennial 9: Book 2, Edited by Antonia Carver and Lara Khaldi (Bidoun/Sharjah Art Foundation, 2010)
- Further Reading (Bidoun, 2011)
- Here and Elsewhere, Edited by Kaelen Wilson-Goldie and Negar Azimi (New Museum, 2014)
- Reza Abdoh, Edited by Negar Azimi, Tiffany Malakooti and Michael C. Vazquez (Bidoun/Hatje Kantz/MoMA PS1/KW Institute for Contemporary Art, 2021) ISBN 9783775745529
- Meriem Bennani: Life on the CAPS, Edited by Negar Azimi, Tiffany Malakooti (The Renaissance Society/Bidoun, 2023) ISBN 9780941548878

=== Issues and themes ===
- Issue 00: We Are You
- Issue 01: We Are Spatial
- Issue 02: We Are Old
- Issue 03: Hair
- Issue 04: Emirates Now
- Issue 05: Icons
- Issue 06: Envy
- Issue 07: Tourism
- Issue 08: Interviews
- Issue 09: Rumor
- Issue 10: Technology
- Issue 11: Failure
- Issue 12: Projects
- Issue 13: Glory
- Issue 14: Objects
- Issue 15: Pulp
- Issue 16: Kids
- Issue 17: Flowers
- Issue 18: Interviews
- Issue 19: Noise
- Issue 20: Bazaar
- Issue 21: Bazaar II
- Issue 22: Library
- Issue 23: Squares
- Issue 24: Sports
- Issue 25: Egypt
- Issue 26: Soft Power
- Issue 27: Diaspora
- Issue 28: Interviews

== Quotes ==
"Bidoun emerged at just the right time as the world looked at the Middle East through the singular lens of failure. The magazine is smart and irreverent in all the right ways." —Ahdaf Soueif

"Bidoun’s editorial voice might be described as a combination of Artforum and Harper's, its audience comprising artists, academics, and intellectually curious readers who enjoy a magazine that manages to dissect Edward Said and Michael Jackson in the same issue." —Print magazine
