= Maamoun =

Maamoun is an Arabic surname. Notable people with the surname include:

- Karim Maamoun (born 1979), Egyptian tennis player
- Karim-Mohamed Maamoun (born 1991), Egyptian tennis player
- Maha Maamoun (born 1972), Egyptian artist and curator
