= Rana El Nemr =

Egyptian visual artist

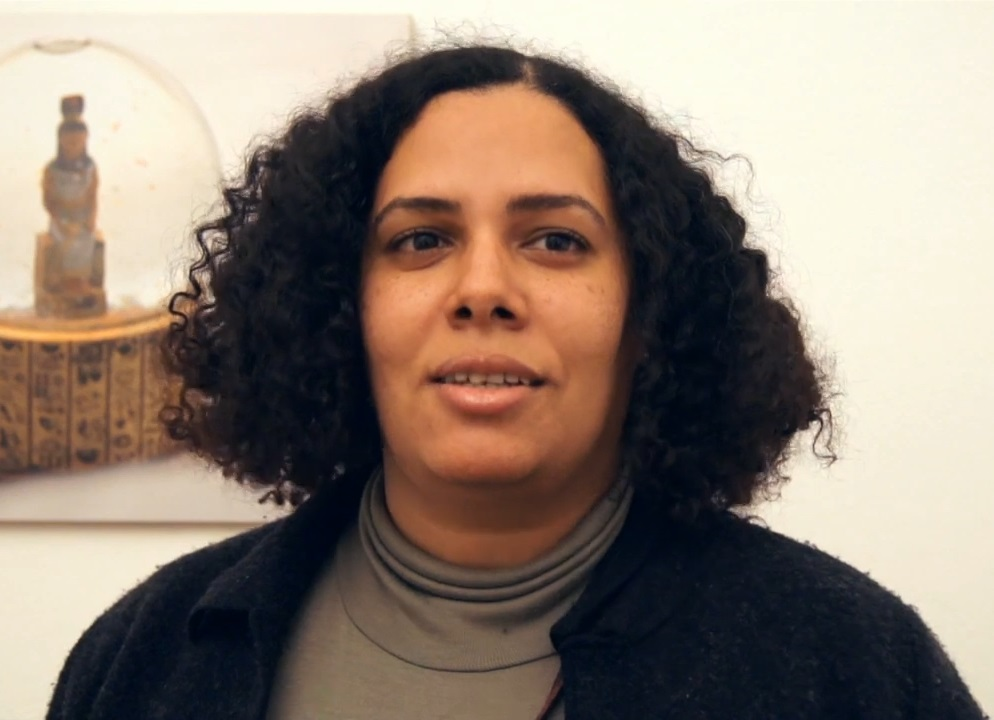
Rana El Nemr, 2012

Rana El Nemr (also Rana Elnemr, Egyptian, born 1974 in Hanover, Germany) is a visual artist based in Cairo, Egypt. Working primarily in photography, she has undertaken explorations of contemporary Egyptian urban life, including Cairo's architectural features, public/private spaces, middle-class identity, and the larger urban environment. Her artistic practice moves from formalist explorations of photography as a medium to genre-bending visual essays of her surroundings in Egypt. Her practice is anchored in questioning what it means to live and experience place and time, through recording, describing, and reflecting on this experience via photography, film, texts and conversations. El Nemr's artistic process incorporates formal image-making techniques with contemporary artistic practices, and it strives to integrate various forms of collaborations in different constellations, such as trans-disciplinary collaborations and alternative pedagogical practices among many others. She is a co-founder of the Contemporary Image Collective (CIC), an institution founded in 2004 in Downtown Cairo, whose programming includes lectures, screenings, and workshops that explore the changing role of photography in contemporary visual culture. El Nemr remains an active board member of CiC.

== Education and career ==
El Nemr studied photojournalism, advertising, and arts at the American University, Cairo. She has exhibited internationally, including in Lebanon, Switzerland, Germany, Japan, Finland, and the United States. One of El Nemr's noted series, The Metro, from 2003, presents women in traditional and non-tradition clothing in the Cairo subway, compositionally framed by the structure of the train cars.

== Selected works ==
=== Giza Threads (2012) ===
Rana ElNemr's Giza Threads is a photographic project that examines the layered dynamics of Giza's urban landscape by exploring the interplay between dominant, powerful forces and smaller, fleeting disruptions. ElNemr refers to these elements as “currents” and “streams,” where currents represent the city's structured, forceful, and unyielding aspects, while streams are delicate, momentary interventions filled with vibrancy and warmth. Together, they define the rhythms of Giza's urban life. Through her lens, and with a nod to her background in photojournalism, ElNemr captures the tension between these forces, revealing how small-scale, often-overlooked details disrupt and enrich the rigid flow of the city's everyday life. Her images highlight moments such as unexpected light displays on unfinished buildings or the overgrown beauty of neglected urban gardens, showcasing the unplanned aesthetic that emerges from these interruptions. Elnemr's method involves walking through Giza, allowing herself to follow these “currents” and be stopped by the “streams,” creating photographs that are uncomposed yet deeply evocative. Rather than traditional compositions, her work focuses on documenting the city's evolving character through its fragmented and improvised spaces. In Giza Threads, ElNemr presents a fresh perspective on urban life, celebrating the interplay between order and chaos while capturing the city's layered, dynamic identity.

Giza Threads was shown in Elnemr's second solo exhibition at the Townhouse Gallery in Cairo, and was presented by the artist in a talk at Sharjah Art Foundation's 2010 March Meetings.

=== The Olympic Garden (2008–2009, 2009, 2012) ===
Rana El Nemr's Olympic Garden is a site-specific project that investigates the transformed urban space behind Cairo's Egyptian Olympic Centre, where the Al-Ahram Coop Complex once stood before being destroyed in a mysterious fire in 2007. The project explores the survival, social dynamics, and intricacies of life in this space, situated between the upper-middle-class neighborhood of New Maadi and the informal Arab Al-Basateen area. Bordered by barricades covered in graffiti expressing the voices of the trapped residents, the site embodies a tension between renewal and marginalization. El Nemr's work combines photography, texts, and conversations to reflect on the meaning of living and experiencing the city. She describes her project as an exploration of “a specific location with significant geographic importance—a place where a mysterious fire erased life,” examining the survival strategies and complexities of this transient space.

This project exists in three chapters. Olympic Garden #1 consists of three 3-channel, still-image loops made of sound and text, each one between seven and nine minutes in length. The varying lengths of each of the three slow loops allows the viewer to see different combinations of image, sound, and text. Olympic Garden #2 is a sculpture made of photographs printed on translucent paper that show drawings, writing, and other marks on a wall that separates the garden of the Egyptian Olympic Centre from the houses of the garden's users. Olympic Garden #3 is an assemblage of video and still photography from the same site. Olympic Garden #1 (2008–2009) and Olympic Garden #2 (2009) have been exhibited as part of several group exhibitions, and Olympic Garden #3 (2012) was featured in El Nemr's 2014 solo exhibition Assembled in Streams of Synonyms.

=== Coastline (Il Sahel) (2006) ===
Rana El Nemr's Coastline, "il sahel" in Arabic, is a photographic project that examines the gateways marking private resorts and summer residences along Egypt's northern Mediterranean coast. These gateways, often designed before the complexes they represent, serve as symbols of exclusivity, luxury, and aspiration. Their eclectic architectural styles and promotional use in brochures aim to appeal to buyers’ desires for prestige and status. Despite often lacking conceptual ties to the developments they advertise, these gateways reflect the evolving aspirations and identities of Egyptian society. El Nemr explores how these gateways encapsulate the interplay of social, cultural, and economic influences. Each design merges diverse architectural elements and language, embodying contradictions that mirror broader societal dynamics. The gateways symbolize a shift in identity within Egypt, representing a divide between the exclusive gated communities and the broader society. Coastline critiques how these gated complexes offer security and isolation for a wealthy minority, reinforcing the growing disparities in Egyptian society. At the same time, they act as markers of societal transformation, reflecting how Egyptian identity is shaped by both external influences and internal aspirations. Located along a historically significant coastline linked to cultural exchange with Europe, these developments absorb and reflect Western influences, intensifying identity contrasts within Egyptian society.

Costline consists of 64 photographic prints paired with texts. Excerpts from the project were exhibited in PhotoCairo 3 and in its totality in a solo exhibition at Galerie Image in Arhus, Denmark.

=== The Metro (2003–2004) ===
This photography series The Metro blends social commentary with artistic storytelling and presents a reflective view of the rapid changes that were happening to a representative section of Cairo's middle-class, namely its metro riders, in the early 2000s. El Nemr captures passengers in candid, introspective moments both in the metro stations and in the metro carriages. The vivid backdrops of the vibrant ceramic tile designs and backlit advertisements inside the station walls contrast with the invisible, yet mounting and conflicting societal pressures to which each person in this space is subject. The metro setting emphasizes both the humanity but also the anonymity in public spaces. The series explores solitude, cultural identity, and the transient nature of public interactions, and with many of the images also taken in the designated women's carriages, the work also subtly contrasts traditional and modern elements in Cairo's urban life through the diversity of the women's clothing styles.

This series was pivotal in cementing El Nemr's place in the art world and has been internationally recognized, including been awarded "Le Grand Prix" of the Photographic Biennale in Bamako, Mali in 2005 and been exhibited widely as part of art festivals, group exhibitions and solo shows, including a 2004 solo exhibition at Cairo's Townhouse Gallery, and as part of the travelling group exhibition She Who Tells a Story: Women Photographers from Iran and the Arab World at the Museum of Fine Arts, Boston, Carnegie Museum of Art, National Museum of Women in the Arts, and the Ackland Art Museum, between 2013 and 2019. Four prints from The Metro are in the permanent collection of the Museum of Fine Arts, Boston.

=== The Balcony Series (2002–ongoing) ===
Rana El Nemr's Balcony Series is an ongoing exploration of Cairo's urban life, social structures, and individuality through the vibrant, painted balconies of informal housing areas. These balconies, often found in densely populated and poor neighborhoods, act as transitional spaces between private and public life, serving as an expression of agency amidst challenging environments. As El Nemr explains, “The balconies are the positive voices of these areas, expressing Egypt as bright and colourful in the midst of despair. This display, of what is essentially a private part of the home, to the rest of the world is a positive aspect of the Egyptian people.” The project has taken multiple forms over the years, including Telekinesis (2007), a photo animation where balcony images are reassembled into imaginative, surreal housing blocks. These montages “adhere to no constructional or architectural standards,” defying nature and visual habits to reflect the “origin, history, culture, and aesthetics” of their creators. In Tableaux Vivants (2008), excerpts from the series are transformed into a three-dimensional collage of folded postcard booklets, mimicking the improvisation and fragility of informal architecture. Through photography and sculpture, El Nemr's Balcony Series captures the interplay of culture, aesthetics, and resilience, reflecting the dreams and creativity of Cairo's urban communities. She reimagines the balconies of Cairo as symbols of resilience, creativity, and individuality within the city's ever-evolving social fabric.

Variations of this series have been shown in Algiers, Bahrain, Dubai, plus throughout France (Arles, Paris) and Germany (Munich, Berlin, Leipzig, Hildesheim), among others. The images have also been published in 2020's Photobook Africa. In 2003, a selection of the photographs called Colors of the Grey from the series was awarded the bronze award from the Canon Digital Creators' Contest in Tokyo.

== Exhibitions ==
Rana El Nemr has shown her work extensively both in Egypt and internationally and has exhibited her art with some of the world's most renowned cultural institutions, including Documenta and the Kochi Biennale, the photography-focused Les Rencontres d'Arles, as well as Les Rencontres de la Photographie Africaine de Bamako and PhotoCairo, the latter two each on multiple occasions, as well as museums in Egypt, Europe, and the US, including the Bonnenfanten Museum, Museum of Fine Arts Boston, Cairo Palace of the Arts, Leipzig Museum of Applied Arts, Bavarian Academy of Fine Arts, and ZKM | Center for Art and Media Karlsruhe, to name a few. El Nemr has also held solo and group exhibitions at the leading private institutions in the Arab world, including The Townhouse Gallery in Cairo, Beirut Art Center and Ashkal Alwan in Beirut, Darat al Funun in Amman, and The Third Line in Dubai, among many others.

=== Solo exhibitions ===
- 2024 Studio: Rana El Nemr, Kunsthalle Mannheim, Germany (Curator: Susanna Baumgartner)
- 2023 Engrams of a Lunar Calendar, Studio Takhshina, Cairo, Egypt
- 2020 Rana El Nemr: A Fine Structure Constant, Bayerische Akademie der Schönen Künste, Munich, Germany
- 2017 A Chapter of Synonyms, Beirut Art Center, Beirut, Lebanon (Curator: Marie Muracciole)
- 2014–2015 Assembled in Streams of Synonyms, Sharjah Art Gallery, The American University in Cairo, Egypt (Curator: Maha Maamoun)
- 2012 Giza Threads, The Townhouse Gallery, Cairo, Egypt
- 2006 Coastline (Il Sahel), Galleri Image, Aarhus, Denmark
- 2004 The Metro, The Townhouse Gallery, Cairo, Egypt

=== Group exhibitions (selection) ===
- 2023 Kochi-Muziris Biennale, Kerala, India (Artworks: The Firesticks Library, It became known now that King Marriout has a library)
- 2022 Documenta Fifteen DXV, Kassel, Germany (as part of Another Roadmap Africa Cluster ARAC) (Artworks: The Firesticks Library, It became known now that King Marriout has a library, Making the Garden, The Humungous Treehouse, Touriste Pedestre)
- 2022 The 8th Triennial of Photography Hamburg, Germany (artwork: riparian)
- 2022 Photobooks: Art Page by Page, Leipzig Museum of Applied Arts, Germany (Artworks: Eenbes Tells, Tableaux Vivants)
- 2020 Photobook Africa. Tracing Stories and Imagery Zentralinstitut für Kunstgeschichte, Munich, Germany
- 2019 In the Land of Light and its Shadows, Bonnenfanten Museum, Maastricht, the Netherlands (Curator: Maha Maamoun) (Artwork: A Chapter of Synonyms)
- 2019 Our Land, Amelie A. Wallace Gallery, New York, USA (curated by Anthony Hamboussi) (Artwork: The Khan)
- 2019 She Who Tells A Story, Ackland Art Museum, Chapel Hill, NC, USA (Artwork: The Metro)
- 2018 Truth is black, write over it with a mirage's light, Darat Al Funun, Amman, Jordan (Artwork: A Chapter of Synonyms)
- 2017–2018 In Rebellion. Female Narratives In The Arab World, IVAM Institut d'Art Modern, Valencia, Spain
- 2016 Cairo NOW! A City Incomplete, Dubai Design Week, UAE (Curator: Mohamed Elshahed) (Artwork: Telekinesis from The Balcony Series)
- 2016 She Who Tells A Story, National Museum of Women in the Arts, Washington D.C., USA (Artwork: Metro)
- 2015 She Who Tells A Story, Carnegie Museum of Art, Pittsburgh, PA, USA (Artwork: The Metro)
- 2013–2014 She Who Tells A Story, Museum of Fine Arts, Boston, MA, USA (Artwork: The Metro)
- 2013 Cross-border: Contemporary Female Artists from the Arabian Mediterranean Region, ZKM | Center for Art and Media Karlsruhe, Germany
- 2011 Afropolis. City, Media, Art, Iwalewahaus, Bayreuth, Germany (Curators: Kerstin Pinther, Christian Hanussek, Larissa Förster) (Artworks: Olympic Garden #1, Olympic Garden #2)
- 2010–2011 Afropolis. City, Media, Art, Rautenstrauch-Joest-Museum, Cologne, Germany (Curators: Kerstin Pinther, Christian Hanussek, Larissa Förster) (Artworks: Olympic Garden #1, Olympic Garden #2)
- 2010 As the Land Expands, Al Riwaq Art Space, Adliya, Bahrain (Curator: November Paynter with the APT) (Artworks: Balcony Series in Green)
- 2010 Afropolis. City, Media, Art, Goethe-Institut Nairobi, Kenya (Curators: Kerstin Pinther, Christian Hanussek, Larissa Förster) (Artworks: Olympic Garden #1, Olympic Garden #2)
- 2009 2nd Pan-African Cultural Festival, Algiers, Algeria (Artworks: The Balcony Series in Green)
- 2009 Rencontres de la Photographie Africaine de Bamako, Bamako, Mali (Artwork: Olympic Garden #1)
- 2008–2009 PhotoCairo 4: The Long Shortcut, Cairo, Egypt (Curators: Edit Molnar, Aleya Hamza) (Artwork: Olympic Garden #1)
- 2008 Cairoscape: Images, Imagination and Imaginary of a Contemporary Mega City, Kunstraum Kreuzberg/Bethanien, Berlin, Germany (Concept: Marina Sorbello, Curators: Marina Sorbello, Antje Weitzel) (Artworks: Telekinesis, Tableaux Vivants)
- 2008 Figure/Ground: 4 Women and their Surroundings, The Third Line, Dubai (Artworks: Balcony Series in Green)
- 2007 Fokus Ägypten–Focus on Egypt, Kunstverein Hildesheim, Germany (Artworks: Telekinesis, Balcony Series in Green)
- 2007 Photoquai (First Edition), Photoquai, Paris, France (Artworks: Telekinesis, Balcony Series in Green)
- 2007 LUMO International Photography Triennale, Edition 7, Jyväskylä, Finland (Artwork: Telekinesis)
- 2005 PhotoCairo 3, Cairo, Egypt (Curators: Maha Maamoun, Aleya Hamza) (Artwork: Coastline (Il Sahel))
- 2005 Rencontres de la Photographie Africaine de Bamako, Bamako, Mali (Artwork: The Metro)
- 2005 Home Works 3, Ashkal Alwan and Sfeir-Semler Gallery, Beirut, Lebanon (Artwork: The Metro)
- 2004 Women by Women–Acht Fotografinnen aus der Arabischen Welt, Fotografie Forum international FFi, Frankfurt, Germany (Curator: Michket Krifa) (Artwork: The Metro)
- 2003 Rencontres de la Photographie Africaine de Bamako, Bamako, Mali (Curators: Josep 'Pep' Subirós, Simon Njami) (Artwork: The Metro)
- 2003 Voies off Festival–L’Africe en Face, Arles, France (Artworks: Balcony Series, Colors of the Grey)
- 2003 Canon Digital Creators' Contest Award-Winning Works, Tokyo, Japan (Artworks: Balcony Series, Colors of the Grey)
- 2003 Arabic Women's Art of the 20th Century, The Palace of the Arts, Cairo, Egypt
- 2003 Nile Photographic Salon, Cairo, Egypt
- 2003 Egypt Art Biennale, Cairo, Egypt
- 2003 Youth Salon, The Palace of the Arts, Cairo, Egypt

== Residencies ==
- 2019–2020 Ludwig-Maximilians-Universität München (LMU), Munich, Germany
- 2019 Jan Van Eyck Academy, Maastricht, the Netherlands
- 2018 Marr.tein, Beirut, Lebanon
- 2017 Fresh Eyes, Galerie Image, Aarhus, Denmark
- 2010 Badgast, The Hague, the Netherlands
- 2007 Art in General, New York, USA
- 2005 ECAVE, Sierre, Switzerland

== Awards ==
In 2003, Rana El Nemr was awarded the grand international prize of the Rencontres de la Photographie Africaine de Bamako in Mali for her series The Metro, work that also won her the Silver Award at the Nile Salon Photographic Exhibition in Egypt. That same year, El Nemr was also awarded the Bronze Award from the Canon Digital Creators Contest that was held in Tokyo. She was twice nominated for the Paul Huf Young Photographer of the Year Award, in 2007 and 2008, respectively. Other nominations include the Prix Pictet in Paris (2010), The Aimia | AGO Photography Prize in Ontario, Canada (2015), and the Bank Vontobel Contemporary Photography Prize in Switzerland (2018).

== Bibliography ==
- Aly, Doa (2017). Condemned to Depth: Invisible Architecture in Rana El Nemr's Streams of Synonyms. Ibraaz.
