= Shumon Basar =

Bangladesh born British writer, editor and curator

Shumon Basar (born 15 October 1974) is a British writer, editor and curator.

== Life and education ==
Basar was born in Pabna, Bangladesh, in 1974. His mother Dilruba Basar emigrated with him to the United Kingdom, to join his father, Abul Basar, who had already settled to work as a medical psychiatrist. The family lived in several Northern towns and cities until they settled in Blackpool in 1985. Basar attended Gonville and Caius College, Cambridge University as undergraduate between 1993 and 1996. Between 1998 and 2000 he studied at the AA School, London. In 2005 Basar was invited by Eyal Weizman to join a new doctoral program within the Department of Visual Cultures, Goldsmiths, University of London. Since 2009, Basar has lived in Dubai, Vancouver, Berlin, Beirut, Istanbul, and travelled extensively through the Middle East.

== Books ==
Authored

The Age of Earthquakes, co-authored with the novelist Douglas Coupland and curator Hans Ulrich Obrist, was published in 2015 by Penguin Books in the UK, Blue Rider Press in the US and Eichborn in Germany.

Do You Often Love with Success and with Fame? was a 2012 book written by Basar and published by the Dubai gallery Traffic. It consisted only of rhetorical questions, one per page, and mimicked a classic leather-bound pocket diary.

Edited

Drone Fiction and Autobiography were two volumes edited by Shumon Basar and H.G. Masters, and published by Globe Books in 2013 as part of the Global Art Forum, Dubai.

Translated By was edited by Charles Arsene-Henry and Shumon Basar, designed by Zak Kyes and published by Bedford Press in 2011. It accompanied a touring exhibition and featured text contributions from writers Douglas Coupland, Rana Dasgupta, Hu Fang, Julien Gracq, Jonathan Lethem, Tom McCarthy, Guy Mannes Abbott, Sophia Al Maria, Hisham Matar, Adania Shibli and Neal Stephenson. An expanded English/Turkish version was published by SALT, Istanbul, in 2012 entitled Tercüme Eden.

Hans Ulrich Obrist Interviews: Volume 2 was edited by Charles Arsene-Henry, Shumon Basar and Karen Marta, and published by Charta in 2010. "This is the second volume of interviews from curator Hans Ulrich Obrist's ongoing infinite conversation. It contains dialogues with some of the most significant architects, artists, filmmakers, historians, musicians, philosophers and writers from the twentieth and twenty-first centuries." "The three editors decided to do it according to birthdays so highlighting the five generations occupied by the interviewees," said Obrist, about the system of organising the 70 interviews.

The World of Madelon Vriesendorp was edited by Shumon Basar and Stephan Trueby, designed by Kasia Koczak and published by AA Publications in 2008. It accompanied the first career retrospective of the London-based, Dutch artist Madelon Vriesendorp and included essays and interviews by Charles Jencks, Beatriz Colomina, Douglas Coupland, Zaha Hadid, Rem Koolhaas, Charlie Koolhaas and others.

Cities from Zero was edited by Shumon Basar, designed by Kasia Korczak/Boy Vereeken and published by AA Publications in 2007. "The contributors in this book... focus on both the Gulf emirate of Dubai and the rapid urbanisation of China. Are cities from zero universal blueprints of a better world for all of us, or doomed, out-dated models of already extinct ideologies?"

With/Without was co-edited by Shumon Basar, Antonia Carver and Markus Miessen, designed by Jana Allerding, and published by Bidoun/Moutamarat in 2007. Containing 30 essays and articles on an array of Middle Eastern cities such as Damascus, Tehran, Cairo, Istanbul and Mecca, Kaelen Wilson-Goldie wrote that, "the editors set themselves the task not of celebrating or bashing Dubai but rather of offering a third way between neoliberal and neoleft readings of the place."

Did Someone Say Participate? was edited by Shumon Basar and Markus Miessen, designed by Abake and published by Revolver and MIT Press in 2006. Dominic Eichler, in Frieze magazine, described it as, "an atlas of sorts, but one that maps an extended academic circle and its response to a built world being radically reshaped by conflict and globalization."

== Magazines ==
In 1999, Basar co-founded an independent magazine entitled sexymachinery with friends Dominik Kremerskothen and Stephanie Talbot. After Talbot's departure, the collective grew to include Patrick Lacey, Dagmar Radmacher, Benjamin Reichen, Kajsa Stahl and Maki Suzuki. From 2001 to 2007, sexymachinery released a number of innovative printed issues that eschewed the tendency to move content online, hosted a number of events which they considered "live issues," collaborated with brands such as Adidas and Mandarina Duck, and art directed the dance-pop band Freeform Five.

Having joined in 2001, Basar is currently Editor-at-Large at the fashion/culture quarterly Tank Magazine.

He is also contributing editor at the Middle East arts and culture magazine Bidoun.

He has written journalism, criticism and reviews for ArtReview, Frieze, Art Monthly, Art Papers, 032c, Contemporary, Blueprint, Icon, Abitare, Domus, AA Files and The Sunday Telegraph.

== Global Art Forum ==
Commissioner & Director-at-Large

In 2012, the director of Art Dubai, Antonia Carver, invited Basar to reinvent its associated cultural program, the Global Art Forum, which had been running since 2007 in a form derived from Art Basel Talks. Global Art Forum 6, under the directorship of Basar, was entitled "The Medium of Media" and took place in Doha, Qatar (18/19 March 2012) and Dubai (21–24 March 2012). It expanded the disciplinary remit to include novelists, historians, filmmakers and journalists; as well as introducing the Globe Books imprint; long-term research projects and curated art and media exhibitions. "The Medium of Media" investigated the meaning of the word "media" in an art context as well as the role that media played in the unfolding of the Arab Spring which was barely a year old at that point. This was followed by Global Art Forum 7 (17–23 March 2013), commissioned by Basar, directed by H.G.Masters, and entitled "It Means This." The theme of language has been an ongoing concern for Basar, who has said, "Contemporary reality is often ahead of our ability to describe it, because we are still left behind in the terminology of the previous era or moment. Such a schism leads to blindness about what is actually happening to us, around us." Global Art Forum 8 (15/16 & 19–21 March 2014) was commissioned by Basar, directed by Omar Berrada and Ala Younis, and entitled "Meanwhile... History." It assembled an imaginary timeline of histories lost, forgotten and erased. Topics included Soviet Orientalism, Pan Kaffirism, Ibn Khaldun's The Muqadimmah, and Trajectories of the Sudanese Gulf. The 2015 edition of Global Art Forum 9, entitled "Download Update?" was co-directed by Sultan Sooud Al-Qassemi and Turi Munthe, with Basar acting as Director-as-Large. 2016's edition marked the tenth anniversary of the Global Art Forum. It was called "The Future Was" (9/14 January & 16–18 March 2016), co-directed by Amal Khalaf and Uzma Z. Rizvi, with Basar as Commissioner, focusing on how visions of the future have been formulated in the past. Guests included Hito Steyerl, Elie Ayache, Alice Gorman, Adrienne Maree Brown, Noura Al Noman, Lauren Beukes and Sophia Al Maria. "Trading Places" was the title of the 2017 iteration of the Global Art Forum, co-directed by Antonia Carver and Oscar Guardiola-Rivera, with Basar, again, as Commissioner.

Reception

The intellectual ambitions and playful format of the Global Art Forum have been positively received by audiences and critics alike. In 2012, Tod Wodicka wrote in The National newspaper, "That GAF took place on an island felt somehow important, and illustrated the oft repeated—and manifestly true—claim that it acted as Art Dubai's brain." And then in 2013, Einar Engström wrote in Leap magazine, "Among the invited guests, the 'artist' was barely present. He was chiefly superseded by those outside the art-industry consciousness: the political scientist, the translator, the novelist, the archaeologist, and so on—those who have as much or even more impact on the world and its artists than do the pedestaled curator and critic." In a preview for the 2016 edition, Rachel Spence in the Financial Times said "The forum has come to be recognised as a hub of ideas that has helped to fuel the development of the contemporary art scene in the Gulf."

== Format ==
Since 2006, Basar has contributed to the Public Program at the AA School, London, drawing in notable figures from contemporary culture. His guests have included Ken Adam, Peter Saville, Momus, Claude Parent, Archigram, Keller Easterling, Rem Koolhaas, Alice Rawsthorn, Julia Peyton-Jones, Beatriz Colomina, Nicolai Ouroussoff, Jan de Cock and Hella Jongerius. In 2011, Basar started an annual "live magazine" called FORMAT, which looks, "at the shapes that discourse takes." Each issue takes a cultural or historical format (such as Magic, Philosophy, Lecture, Library, Anniversary, Chat Show, Spam, Cover Version, Protest, Reality, Essay, Trailer, Hobsbawm, Kurt Cobain, Career, Couple) and invites guests (such as The Otolith Group, Cécile B. Evans, Jonathan Allen, Sam Jacob, Brian Dillon, Peter Webber, Oscar Guardiola-Rivera, Tamara Barnett-Herrin) to provide personal insights on how knowledge has been "formatted."

== Curating ==
Exhibitions include:

- Slight Agitation (curated as part of the Fondazione Prada Thought Council (Shumon Basar, Cédric Libert, Elvira Dyangani Ose, Dieter Roelstraete)) between 2015 and 2017, presents site specific commissions, arranged successively as four "chapters", "agitating the mind and body, senses and space," by artists Tobias Putrih, Pamela Rosenkranz, Laura Lima and gelitin. For example, Rosenkranz's intervention, entitled "Infection," presented, "A huge, almost sublime mountain of sand... its scale pressuring against the historic architecture. The sand is impregnated with fragrance of synthetic cat pheromones that activates a specific, biologically determined attraction or repulsion and subconsciously influence the public’s movement." It takes place in the Cisterna building, at the Fondazione Prada Milano.
- Recto Verso (curated as part of the Fondazione Prada Thought Council) focused on “artworks that consciously foreground the hidden, concealed or forgotten phenomenon of 'the back.'" It took place in the Stecca Nord building, at the Fondazione Prada Milano.
- Trittico (curated as part of the Fondazione Prada Thought Council) between 2015 and 2016, “a dynamic display strategy devised by the Thought Council. Three carefully selected works from the Collezione Prada are installed at a time, periodically rotating.” It took place in the Cisterna building, at the Fondazione Prada Milano.
- Translated By (co-curated with Charles Arsene-Henry) in 2011/12, “the show is a kind of audio mix-tape of fictional and real places written by international authors.” It toured from London to Kitakyushu and Istanbul.
- The World of Madelon Vriesendorp (co-curated with Stephan Trüby) in 2008/09, a 40-year retrospective of the artist. It toured from London to Berlin, Venice and Basel.
- Can Buildings Curate (co-curated with Joshua Bolchover and Parag Sharma) in 2005/06, featuring work by Marcel Duchamp, Friedrich Kiesler, Lina Bo Bardi, Neal Rock, Dee Ferris, Goshka Macuga and others. It toured from London to Bristol, New York and Lausanne.
