= Janich =

Janich is a surname. Notable people with the surname include:

- Agnes Janich (born 1985), Polish visual artist
- Francesco Janich (1937–2019), Italian footballer
- Oliver Janich (born 1973), German author, journalist and politician
- Peter Janich (1942–2016), German professor of philosophy
- Steffen Janich (born 1971), German politician
