= Ala Younis =

Jordanian artist and curator

- Born: 1974 (age 51–52); Kuwait
- Education: University of Jordan
- Known for: Painting
- Website: alayounis.com

Ala Younis is a Kuwaiti research-based visual artist, painter, and curator, based in Amman, Jordan. Younis initiates journeys in archives and narratives, and reinterprets collective experiences that have collapsed into personal ones. Through research, she builds collections of objects, images, information, narratives, and notes on why/how people tell their stories. Her practice is based on found material, and on creating materials when they cannot be found or when they do not exist.

== Early life and education ==
Born in Kuwait in 1974 to a Kuwaiti family of Palestinian descent, Younis moved to Amman in 1984. She graduated as an architect from the University of Jordan in 1997. She holds a Masters in Research in Visual Cultures from Goldsmiths, University of London since 2016.

== Career ==
Younis has produced art installations, video works, publications, temporary collectives, publishing projects, and curated exhibitions. Her curatorial projects include Kuwait's first national pavilion at the Venice Biennale in 2013, the nomadic collection of Museum of Manufactured Response to Absence, and "An Index of Tensional and Unintentional Love of Land" at New Museum in the context of "Here and Elsewhere" exhibition organized in 2014. Her work was shown at the Institute du Monde Arabe (2013), 9th Gwangju Biennial (2012), Museum of Modern Arab Art in Doha (2012), New Museum Triennial (2012), 12th Istanbul Biennial (2011), Home Works '5 Beirut (2010), The Jerusalem Show (2009), PhotoCairo 4 (2008) and other places. She also participated in the Asian Art Biennial, Dhaka (2006) and the Iran Biennial: Art in the Contemporary Islamic World (2005).

Her publication projects include 'Needles to Rockets' (2009), 'Tin Soldiers' (2012), and the non-profit publishing initiative Kayfa-ta, a series of cost-effective Arabic monographs on how to, co-founded with artist Maha Maamoun. She is a recipient of the Bellagio Creative Arts Fellowship, as well as art prizes from Cairo's 17th Youth Salon (2005) and Jordanian Artists Association (2005). Younis co-directed Global Art Forum 8 (2014), and has spoken in conferences and symposiums including Venice Agendas (2013), Berlinale's Forum Expanded (2013–2015), Sweet Sixities Beirut (2013), Global Art Forum 7 in Doha (2013), and ThinkFilm in Berlin (2012). Younis worked as the artistic director (2009–10), acting director (2008–09) and assistant director (2006–08) of Darat al Funun – The Khalid Shoman Foundation in Amman. She also curated film programs for the three editions of Arab Shorts – Independent Arab Film Festival (2009–2011) organized by Goethe Institut Cairo, and is on the advisory board of Berlinale's Forum Expanded. She is a member of the Academy of Arts of the World in Cologne, Germany. Younis is a contributing editor for the artist magazine Ibraaz and a research scholar at the Mawrid Arab Center for the Study of Art, at the NYU Abu Dhabi.

Younis has collaborated with the Arsenal Institute for Film and Video Art since 2012 and in 2021, she became co-head of the Berlinale Forum Expanded together with Ulrich Ziemons. She was also the co-artistic director of the Singapore Biennale 2022. In May 2023, she was appointed artistic director at the Academy of Arts of the World in Cologne, Germany. From October 2025 until January 2026, Younis exhibition Past of Temporal Universe, consisting of her own work from the last two decades, was displayed at the NYU Abu Dhabi Art Gallery.

== Curatorial projects ==
In 2013, for Kuwait's first national pavilion at the 55th Venice Biennale, Ala Younis curated "National Works". The show disassembled symbols of grandeur in paused/post glorious times, in an attempt to re-interpret Kuwait's modernization project, while the exhibition's publication explored the emotional and theoretical contexts of works at a time when national identity was not questioned, and when modernist projects, cultural or contractual, were national works. ""The sleeper hit of the summer among the pavilions from this part of the world is Kuwait's pavilion, nimbly curated by Ala Younis. It features a curious installation delving into the heart-stopping history of Sami Mohammad's statues, alongside a ruminative, achingly lonely series of photographs mounted on light boxes by the artist Tarek al-Ghoussein. Younis' sensitive excavation of Mohammad's work allows for some searching self criticality on nationalism and modernity from within the pavilion itself. Ghoussein's "K-Files" represent a seamless and gorgeous continuation of his staged self-portraiture series, working in a mode he calls performance photography."

This show followed her curated "Museum of Manufactured Response to Absence (MoMRtA)" which premiered at Museum of Modern Art in Kuwait and Museum of Modern in 2012. Initiated and produced by MinRASY Projects, the museum is a nomadic collection of commissioned objects that respond to the absence of Palestinians and their history from Kuwait, each object of which is an impossibility or exaggeration. The show premiered at Kuwait's Museum of Modern Art in May 2012.

Her other curatorial projects include:

- co-curated exhibitions for the Archival Assembly #1, 2021
- "An Index of Tensional and Unintentional Love of Land" exhibition set within "Here and Elsewhere" exhibition at New Museum in New York, 2014
- "This land first speaks to you in signs", exhibition of archival materials and some films from the collection of Cimatheque, Cairo and Berlin, 2015
- "The closest I've ever come to a scientific experiment", at the project space of Mathaf: Arab Museum of Modern Art, Doha, 2014
- "Covering One's Back", a photography exhibition co-curated with Maha Maamoun, Gezira Art Center, Cairo, 2013
- "The Crowd Behind Us", presented at three venues within the Image Festival in Amman, 2012
- "Momentarily Learning from Mega-Events" at Makan art space, Amman, 2011
- "Outre mesure et programmes radio" at La Galeriem Noisy-Le-Sec, Paris, 2011
- "Out of Place", co-curated with Kasia Redzisz for Tate Modern and Darat al Funun's collaboration project, presented at both institutions in 2011.

== Art projects ==
Her projects begin with found objects and images that might initially seem odd or intriguing, for instance Nefertiti (2008) is an installation of video and defunct sewing machines (Nefertiti) that were produced and sold in Egypt after the 1952 revolution, and were among the country's plan to nationalize industrial production and to create productive symbols of Egyptian sovereignty. The manufacture of Nefertiti was discontinued in the 1980s, due to various flaws in the design. "For Younis, its manufacture was a 'feminist project' that, although it confined women to the domestic space, also, 'aimed at empowering Egyptian housewives, since it gave them a chance to earn money while their husbands were away fighting'. Yet once the old, elegant, curvaceous Nefertiti was retired, the market was flooded with aesthetically inferior Western machines. The Nefertiti became a focus for nostalgia, and this video explores people's attachment to their old sewing machines."

Her found objects become part of a web of stories in which the personal is inextricable from the collective, like in the publication version of "Tin Soldiers" (2010–2) which is made of text and image portraits of contemporary (in)formal Middle Eastern soldiers, and the virtual and alternative spaces they practice their version of militarism in. "Tin Soldiers" is also an installation of 12,265 metal figurines depicting nine armies of the Middle East. The project was produced and shown at HomeWorks 5 in Beirut (2010) and at the Istanbul Biennial (2011). The publication version was also installed as an exhibition at the New Museum Triennial and at the Gwangju Biennial, both took place in 2012.

"UAR" (2014) is a series, of drawings and found objects, that studies the stories and mechanisms that produced Gamal Abdel Nasser's historical figure in the time of the United Arab Republic (1958–1971). The project starts from a photograph of Nasser looking onto an enthusiastic and proud Arab crowd during the signing of a sovereign union agreement between Egypt and Syria in 1958.

Oraib Toukan and Ala Younis collaborate on exploring film footage, discarded by the former Soviet Friendship Society in Amman. They both "developed a peculiar archeology of research that looks at early Palestinian film production, technocratic Soviet friendships, cine clubs, and Russian language films in Amman." Their 3-minute film from this research, titled "From the impossibility of one page being like the other", was broadcast on Channel 4 (UK) at New York Film Festival in 2014.

Her project "Plan for Greater Baghdad" was selected for "All the World's Futures" curated by Okwui Enwezor for the 56th International Art Exhibition – La Biennale di Venezia, and show in Arsenale in 2015. Produced in two and three-dimensional prints, "Plan for Greater Baghdad" traces the stories and links around Saddam Hussein Gymnasium in Baghdad that was designed by Le Corbusier. Activated by a set of 35mm slides taken by architect Rifat Chadirji in 1982, the project reproduces documents that relate to monuments, architects, governments, and the shifts and tensions between ideals and ideologies. The project borrows its title from Frank Lloyd Wright's proposal for a cultural center and an Opera House in Baghdad. His "Plan for Greater Baghdad" was a result of his visit to Baghdad in 1957, yet it was never built.

Younis received the 2nd prize at the 17th Youth Salon, Painting for Non Egyptians, in Cairo (2005); and the 3rd Prize at the Annual Exhibition of Jordanian Artists Association in Amman (2005). In 2012 she was selected by Christine Tohme as one of ArtReview's 'Future Greats 2012'.

Younis examined the Aswan High Dam from 2015 to 2025 in her "High Dam" series, which is her longest running series.

== Selected exhibitions ==
2018: Plan for Feminist Greater Baghdad – Solo exhibition at Delfina Foundation London and Art Jameel Dubai.

2015: -All the World's Futures, 56th International Art Exhibition – La Biennale di Venezia, curated by Okwui Enwezor, Venice

2014: – New York Film Festival, New York – Here and Elsewhere, exhibition curated by Massimiliano Gioni and team, New Museum, New York. Participation took the form of a curated exhibition at the 5th floor titled "An Index of Tensional and Unintentional Love of Land" – Multitude, Sesc Pompeia, São Paulo – Tea with Nefertiti, Staatliches Museum Ägyptischer Kunst, Munich – UAR, solo exhibition at Gypsum Gallery, Cairo – Meeting Points 7, Ten thousand wiles and a hundred thousand tricks, Cairo, Hong Kong, Beirut, Antwerp and Zaghreb

2013: – Tea with Nefertiti, IVAM Instituto Valenciano de Arte Moderno, Valencia; Institut du Monde Arabe, Paris; Mathaf: Arab Museum of Modern Art, Doha – 59th International Short Film Festival Oberhausen, Lichtburg Filmpalast, Oberhausen

2012: – ROUNDTABLE, 9th Gwangju Biennial, curated by Nancy Adajania – The Ungovernables, exhibition curated by Eunjie Joo, New Museum Triennial, New York – A Gathering, curated by Maria-Thalia Carras and Olga Hatzidaki, Athens – London Palestine Film Festival, London

2011: – Untitled (12th Istanbul Biennial), curated by Adriano Pedrosa and Jens Hoffman, Istanbul

2010: – Home Works 5’, forum and exhibition curated by Christine Tohme, Beirut Art Center, Beirut – Solo exhibition at Delfina Foundation, London

2009: Solo exhibition at Darat al Funun, Amman

2008: – PhotoCairo 4: The Long Shortcut, curated by Aleya Hamza and Edit Molnar, Hungarian Cultural Center, Cairo – The Third International Biennale for the Artist's Book 2008, Bibliotheca Alexandrina

== Publications ==
Ala Younis published "Needles to Rockets" with Motaz Attalla in 2009. The publication collects personal responses to questions that emerge around the place of consumer products in the lives of people and in society at large in Egypt. The people's answers illustrate how objects become iconic and acquire personas, and they tell some of the myths that surround them. The publication is named after Gamal Abdel Nasser's famous slogan of industrial promise.
