= Role Exchange =

Performative Artwork

Role Exchange is a performative artwork created by Marina Abramović in 1975. The work consists of Abramović, an artist, swapping places with a prostitute. Abramović spent time displaying herself through a window in Amsterdam's Red Light District while the prostitute was present at the opening of an exhibit in the De Appel Museum.

== Details and backstory ==
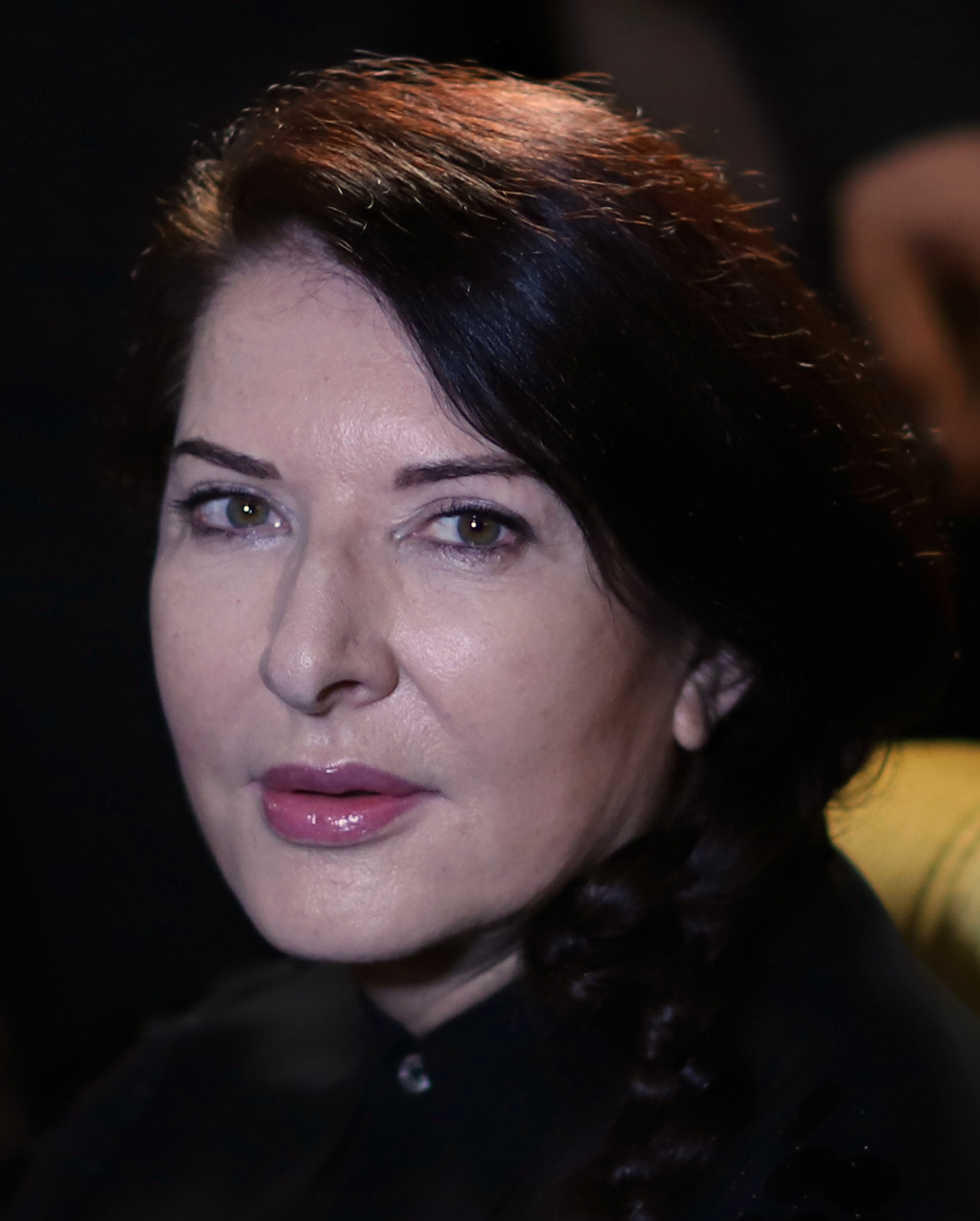
Marina Abramović

Marina Abramović was born in 1946 in Belgrade, Yugoslavia and resided there until moving to Amsterdam in 1975. Upon arriving and seeing prostitutes standing in windows, she considered this to be the lowest one could be in life. She was afraid of the idea of being a prostitute and wanted to confront it in order to liberate herself and understand where the fear comes from.

Abramović befriended a prostitute who agreed to participate in the performative artwork on the condition that she remain anonymous, and therefore, has been referred to as Suze. Abramović looked for a prostitute with ten years professional experience since she had ten years of experience as an artist herself. The two women exchanged roles for four hours and Abramović was instructed by Suze to never go below her price because it would ruin her business. Each woman took responsibility for the experience that the role exchange brought with it and the pair split the $300 artist's fee from the De Appel Museum that Abramović was to receive for attending the exhibit.

The two women performed their unique duties acting as each other in "a complex game of commercial and aesthetic exchange." They were each inside an enclosed space which was visible to the street and anyone passing by could gain access to the spaces.

== Recording and presentation ==
The experiences of both Abramović and the prostitute were registered using separate 16-mm cameras. Their captures were shown at the De Appel Museum at a later date.

More recently, Role Exchange has been presented in museums and collections as a diptych of black and white photographs, each picturing one of the respective women in their swapped place.

The work was featured as a part of Marina Abramović's Museum of Modern Art exhibit "The Artist is Present", where she notoriously sat immobile in the museum's atrium for 700 hours inviting visitors to come sit across from her.

== Themes ==
=== Doorways and windows ===
An important aspect of Role Exchange is the use of windows and doorways, which act as "multilayered metaphors for the interface between public and private spaces, commerce and sexuality, the voyeur and the spectacle, the artists and the prostitute, and the self and the other." This work uses windows and doorways as architectural analogies to illuminate the connection that Abramović creates between the world of art and prostitution.

The windows also function as a barrier between the public world of men (the street) and the semi private world of women (the world of the brothel) which men often infiltrate as a space to access the realm of commercial desire. Similarities are drawn between the picture window in the Red Light District and that of the gallery, as one separates the space of eroticism and fantasy, while the other "emphasizes the space of aesthetic containment."

Apart from their literal meaning as passageways from the street to the interior, whether that be the gallery or the prostitute's space, doorways are symbolic of the threshold by which commerce is conducted. The nature of this commercial exchange is key to the reinforcement of areas of containment used for the indulgence of erotic pleasures, in the case of the prostitute, and aesthetic ones, with regards to the art exhibit.

=== Challenging the art world ===
In Abramović's performance, "playing the game of institutional travesty is a moving force and a transparent manifestation of the work's objective." Role Exchange engages with the concerns of conceptual art, and in this piece she expands the institutional critique by strictly referencing the idea of trade. She moves against the art world in Role Exchange not aimed solely against it and its system of trade but also against the work itself "as an active factor in corroborating with this system of trading."

Role Exchange also plays on the idea of 'real experience' away from the gallery and its surroundings, and rather through appropriating the prostitutes identity and her place of work. The perception of the prostitutes display as a trope for distorted freedom ultimately determines Abramović's choice of identity.

This leads her to explore the question of freedom in the realm of art, a space where strict rules forces artists to settle for the conditions of the art market. Abramović questions artistic institutions as the place of reference for artworks and the nature of the artwork itself, leading her to look into new conceptual spaces for the process of art communication.

Role Exchange proposes that there be a space for critical work outside of galleries or museums, as by being performed only once Abramović is refusing to participate in the contemporary art system where there is a "crucial requirement of durability and timelessness." Through this work, she also looks into the possibility of "contaminating" the pristine museum with the raw reality of life and everyday experience.
