= Parlia =

Website for collecting opinions

- Website type: Public opinion encyclopedia
- Available in: English
- Founded: 2019
- Headquarters: Somerset House, London, UK
- Country of origin: United Kingdom
- Area served: Worldwide
- Founders: Turi Munthe; J. Paul Neeley
- Industry: Civic technology, Digital Media
- Parent: Somerset House Exchange program
- Website: www.parlia.com
- Registration: Optional
- Launched: March 2020; 6 years ago
- Current status: Active
- Funded by the Google Digital News Innovation Fund

Parlia is website dedicated to collecting public opinions on a variety of social and political opinions using short polls. It self-describes as "an encyclopedia of opinion, a project looking to map all of the world's opinions". The name Parlia is derived from the Old English word for negotiation, to "parley." The project was founded by Turi Munthe and J. Paul Neeley. Turi Munthe previously founded Demotix, at the time the "world’s largest network of photojournalists" which sold to Corbis, a Bill Gates company, in 2013. J. Paul Neeley previously founded Yossarian Lives.

Parlia is not a debate site, but looking to "showcasing all opinions in a calm, descriptive voice." The ambition of Parlia is to build a "platform that could map all opinions about everything."

== History ==
The initial funding for development of the Parlia prototype came from a Paul Hamlyn Foundation Ideas and Pioneer Fund and a Google Digital News Innovation Fund grant (DNI). According to Google "The Digital News Innovation Fund (DNI Fund) is a European programme that's part of the Google News Initiative, an effort to help journalism thrive in the digital age." The Google DNI grant was awarded on the fund's 4th round.

Parlia is part of the Somerset House Exchange program, based in London, UK.
