= Ann Demeester =

Belgian art historian, journalist, and museum director (born 1975)

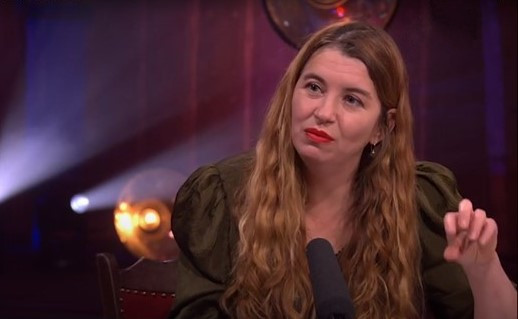
Ann Demeester, 2020

Ann Demeester (born 1975 in Bruges, Belgium) is a Belgian art historian, curator, and museum director. She has held leadership positions in various European art institutions and is known for her contributions to contemporary art and museum practices. She is currently serving as the director of the Kunsthaus Zürich.

== Early life and education ==
Demeester studied Germanic philology at Ghent University and obtained a Master of Cultural Studies at the Katholieke Universiteit Leuven. Early in her career, she worked as an arts and culture editor for Belgian newspapers De Morgen and De Financieel-Economische Tijd. She also served as an assistant to the museum director Jan Hoet, contributing to exhibitions in Belgium and Germany.

== Career ==
=== W139 and De Appel Arts Centre ===
From 2003 to 2006, Demeester was the director of W139, an exhibition and production space for contemporary art in Amsterdam. In May 2006, she became the director of De Appel Arts Centre in Amsterdam, where she led the institution and its curatorial program until January 2014.

=== Frans Hals Museum ===
On February 1, 2014, Demeester was appointed director of the Frans Hals Museum in Haarlem, Netherlands. During her tenure, she emphasized the dialogue between contemporary art and Old Masters, enhancing the museum's profile both nationally and internationally.

=== Kunsthaus Zürich ===
In July 2021, Demeester announced her departure from the Frans Hals Museum to assume the role of director at Kunsthaus Zürich, Switzerland's largest art museum. She officially began her tenure on October 1, 2022, succeeding Christoph Becker. Her appointment was met with anticipation for revitalizing the institution's reputation.

== Academic and editorial roles ==
Demeester has been a member of the editorial board of the quarterly Ghent magazine Yang from 2001 to 2007. She also worked as a journalist for Belgian daily newspapers De Morgen and De Financieel-Economische Tijd. Since 2020, she has served as a professor of Art and Culture at the Anton van Duinkerken Chair at Radboud University Nijmegen.

== Publications ==
- Frans Hals Museum – Director’s Choice. Scala Arts & Heritage Publishers, London 2018. ISBN 978-1-7855-1161-5.
- With Jan Hoet, et al.: Kati Heck. Hatje Cantz, Ostfildern 2016. ISBN 978-3-7757-4131-6.
- With Valérie Mannaerts and Anselm Franke: Valérie Mannaerts: An Exhibition--another Exhibition. Sternberg Press, Berlin 2011. ISBN 978-1-9341-0536-8.
- With Natasha Conland: Mystic Truths. Auckland Art Gallery, 2007. ISBN 978-0-86463-273-9.
