= The Townhouse Gallery =

Non-profit art space in Cairo, Egypt

Coordinates: 30°2′56″N 31°14′16″E

- Founded: 1998
- Type: Non-profit
- Location: Cairo, Egypt
- Website: thetownhousegallery.com

The Townhouse Gallery was established in 1998 by William Wells as an independent, non-profit art space in Cairo, Egypt, with a goal of making contemporary arts accessible to all without compromising creative practice. The Townhouse supports artistic work in a wide range of media through exhibitions, residencies for artists and curators, educational initiatives and outreach programs. By establishing local and international relationships, as well as diversifying both the practitioners and audiences of contemporary art, the Townhouse aims to support and expand the knowledge, appreciation and practice of contemporary arts in Egypt and the region.

== Exhibits and programs ==
The gallery is located in downtown Cairo's bustling car mechanics district. It curates over twelve annual exhibitions in the 650-square-meter Factory and the First Floor gallery of its main building. The exhibitions feature the work of young emerging artists alongside those who are internationally recognized. Many local artists with early shows at the Townhouse have gone on to exhibit worldwide.

The Townhouse has initiated numerous large-scale events, beginning with the citywide Nitaq Festival in 1999. PhotoCairo, the first festival in Egypt exclusively dedicated to photography and video art, was launched in 2002.

Since its inception, the Townhouse has strived to make the arts accessible to different groups of society, whilst using them as a powerful medium for integration and understanding. The gallery's Outreach Program offers a number of arts workshops for adults and children, with participants coming from all over Cairo, including those with special needs and from marginalized communities.

The gallery collaborates with institutions and arts professionals both regionally and internationally to create exhibitions, share resources, and facilitate artist exchanges.

Each year, several international artists hold residencies at the Townhouse, working in studios on the gallery premises and pursuing independent projects in the city. Visiting artists often lead workshops during their stay. In 2009, the Townhouse launched the Rooftop Studio Project, a local residency program for Egyptian artists in need of affordable workspaces. The gallery is currently expanding its residency opportunities to curators and writers with the aim of providing opportunities for interdisciplinary practices to emerge and be independently sustained.

Located on the second floor of Townhouse's main building, the library holds books, journals, and other publications related to the arts. Sections are dedicated to Egyptian art history, monographs on Egyptian artists, and catalogues of exhibitions featuring the work of artists from the Middle East. The library is also a resource for artists researching grants and scholarships as well as educators who want to learn more about child development, refugee issues, and other topics.

== List of artists ==
Ahmed Askalany, Amal Kenawy, Amina Mansour, Amre Heiba, Basim Magdy, Hassan Khan, Sherif El-Azma, Iman Issa, Mona Marzouk, Barry Iverson, Ayman Ramdan, Doa Aly, Hala Alkoussy, Huda Lutfi, Jihan Ammar, Lara Baladi, Maha Maamoun, Martin Mcinally, Mohamed Skarkawy, Nader Sadek, Nermine Hammam, Omar Ghayyatt, Osama Dawod, Rana El Nemr, Rehab El Sadek, Sabah Naim, Scott Baily, Shady El Noshokaty, Susan Hefuna, Tarek Zaki, Wael Shawky, Warren Neidich, Yasser Gerab, Youssef Nabil, Sameh Al Tawil, Mohamed Shoukry

== Exhibits and events ==
In 2000, the Townhouse Gallery co-founded the Nitaq Festival, an arts festival situated in downtown Cairo that aimed to expose multiple publics to contemporary art. The festival included multimedia video installations which were created by various artists including Lara Baladi, Amina Mansour, Hassan Khan, Wael Shawky and Mona Marzouk. Townhouse also initiated Egypt's first exhibition dedicated to photography in 2002, calling it PhotoCairo, with the aim of exposing the public to the various forms of self-expression that are evident in the world of photography. This event proved to be quite successful in 2002 so the event was repeated in 2003 and 2004, accompanied by the Open Studio Project.

Recent exhibits that have been on display during February and March 2010 in the Townhouse Gallery include "The Girl Splendid in Walking" by Doa Aly and "Making A Man Out of Him" by a professor at the American University in Cairo, Huda Lutfi. Both works have proven themselves quite unique to their audiences, each providing a specific experience to the visitors of the Townhouse Gallery. Regarding Doa Aly's work, the video installation, inspired by Wilhelm Jenson's "Gradiva", includes scenes where the girl was in a room, walking and tracing the sunlight with her feet as it beamed through the window, like she was going after the light. Meanwhile, Lutfi's "Making a Man Out of Him", uses the symbolism of the male anatomy as a means of criticizing society's perspective on masculinity. This illustrates how the Townhouse Gallery has the ability to display art that may be viewed as controversial.

== Overall feedback on the Townhouse Gallery ==
Negar Azimi, a Harvard graduate student who worked as a curatorial assistant at the Townhouse Gallery in the early 2000s, wrote an introductory article about the gallery in Nafas Art Magazine in 2004. According to Azimi, the Townhouse Gallery has provided a vital "home" for the display of visual arts in Egypt. However, she argues that "politics remain intimately tied to the arts" and that it is "undeniable" that the state still plays a role in defining what passes as culture. Azimi also argues that Egyptian artists are flourishing as museums and galleries around the world engage their work.
