= Tirdad Zolghadr =

Freelance curator

Tirdad Zolghadr (born 1973 in California), raised in Iran, England, and Switzerland, is an independent curator, art critic and writer based in Berlin, working for Frieze magazine and has also contributed to Parkett, Bidoun, Cabinet, Afterall, Neue Zürcher Zeitung, Straits Times (Singapore) and other publications. He is co-founder of the Tehran-based feminist online magazine Bad Jens (1999) and co-director of "Tehran 1380" (with Solmaz Shahbazi), a documentary on mass housing estates in Tehran (2001). Since 2004, Zolghadr has curated events at Cubitt London, IASPIS Stockholm, Kunsthalle Geneva, various Tehran artspaces, the UAE pavilion at the Venice Biennale and other venues. He was co-curator of the Taipei Biennial and the International Sharjah biennial 2005. Zolghadr is a founding member of the Shahrzad Design Collective.

== Background ==
Zolghadr grew up in Tehran, Zurich, North- and West Africa. He studied Comparative Literature in Geneva, then worked as a cultural journalist and translator before starting to work as a freelance art critic and curator.

== Curator ==
Curated exhibitions:

- Taipei Biennial 2010
- UAE National Pavilion in Venice 2009
- 'Ethnic Marketing' at the Kunsthalle Geneva with M. Anderfuhren, 2004
- Various venues in Tehran in April 2006
- 7th International Sharjah Biennial
- Contributions to Manifesta 6
- Lapdogs of the Bourgeoisie: 2006-2009 Gasworks, London, Platform Garanti Contemporary Art Center, Istanbul, Tensta Konsthall, Townhouse Cairo (2008), Arnolfini Bristol (2009)

== Writer ==
Tirdad Zolghadr has also written a novel, "Softcore", published by Telegram Books in the UK (2007: ISBN 1-846590-20-5) and Kiepenheuer & Witsch in Germany (2008)

...Tirdad Zolghadr's debut novel tells the story of the Promessa nightclub in Tehran, once a glamorous cocktail bar of the 70s and soon to be reopened as a heady mix of art, fashion, and culture. Narrated by an art enthusiast who soon finds himself locked into a complex political detective story, Softcore traces the story of modern-day Iran with wit and panache.
