= Agnes Janich =

Visual artist

- Born: 1985 (age 40–41); Łódź, Poland
- Education: School of Visual Arts, New York City
- Occupations: visual artist working with photography and installation
- Website: http://agnesjanich.com/

Agnes Janich, née: Agnieszka Jeziorska, (born 1985) - a visual artist who works with photography and installation art. Within her practice she deals with the history of memory, love and intimacy. She has presented her work in, among others: 9th Sharjah Biennial in the United Arab Emirates, Galapagos Art Space in New York, Maison Europeene de la Photographie in Paris, Central European House of Photography in Bratislava, Bergen Museum of Art, Fotomuseum Winterthur, Kunsthalle Exnergasse in Vienna and the Auschwitz Jewish Center in Oświęcim affiliated with the Museum of Jewish Heritage, New York. She took part in Art Edition Fair in Seoul Arts Center, Hangaram Art Museum. She is based in Geneva, Switzerland.

== Early life and education ==
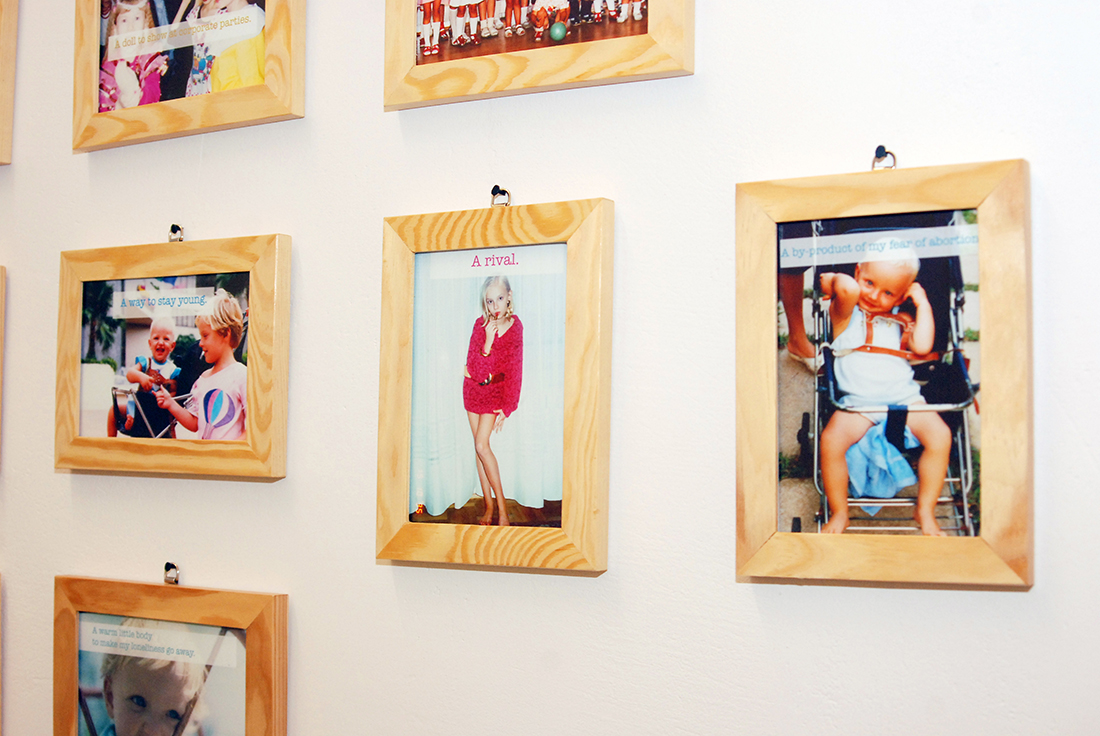
Agnes Janich's work "My Mom's Diary"

Janich was born in Łódź, Poland, though soon after her birth her family moved to Singapore and the Republic of South Africa. She began her education in the Republic of South Africa. Having been raised in a multinational and multicultural environment has influenced her and had impact on her further career and choices. Also, the fact that she was raised in a traditional family of Polish and likely assimilated Jewish descent proved to be of great importance for her further artistic career and identity, i.e., at an early stage of her career she decided to change her name from Polish 'Agnieszka' to English 'Agnes' and assumed the surname 'Janich' after her Jewish great grandma. This choice demonstrates an important role of the family history in her life. She became a member of liberal Jewish communities in New York and in Poland.

Janich's formal education in art history started in the 1st Private High School in Bednarska Street, Warsaw, Poland (2000-2003). She continued her studies at the University of Warsaw (2003-2004), got a Degree with Honors in Fine Art Photography and Commercial Photography from the European Academy of Photography in Warsaw (2003-2005), studied at the Academy of Fine Arts in Warsaw (2004–2005), and finally concluded her education holding a BFA in Photography from the School of Visual Arts in New York (2006-2008), a college that shaped artists such as Keith Haring.

== Career ==
Janich's works reveal her two major interests: one is Holocaust-based themes. Another are: love, sex and emotional entanglement, often seen from a perspective of social norms or cultural restrictions. Based upon that distinction, Janich's career can be divided into two periods: first dating from her early works until 2012, and the second from 2013 to present.

During the first phase Janich has been exploring the history of Holocaust via her own family roots and relating it to the general notion of purity and innocence as opposed to terror, violence and destruction. What is distinctive in her approach is that almost all narrations she presents come either from a herstorical point of view, showing feminist approach and women's perspective, or are communicated by the most defenseless of protagonists, i.e. children.

In the second phase the major interests distinguishable in Janich's art include searching through emotions, intimacy and sexual relations in search of what can be called 'the root of tension' between two individuals tangled in a relationship, often of a social or cultural origin. In this case as well Janich often applies feminist approach.

== Selected works ==
=== Man to Man (2009) ===
It is an multi-video installation in form of a labyrinth leading the viewer through complete darkness to the wall projections of fangs and claws accompanied by the sound of barking dogs. It constitutes the first part of the War Trilogy made by Janich over a period of three years: Man to Man (2009), Bits and Pieces (2010), and Cleanliness is Goodliness (2012), addressing the subject of preserving memory and violence. The work was first presented in 2009 during the ninth Sharjah Biennial in the United Arab Emirates, where it was well received and commented as a disturbing project "where viewers were led through a maze of darkened passages to rooms that dead-ended with videos of relentlessly barking dogs restrained in prison-like cages".

Its interpretation is unambiguous: "This extremely claustrophobic work is a comment about prisons and enslavement". Its main theme is brutal violence and an attempt at dehumanization done to individuals. The critics as well as the viewers have responded to that "(...) distinct suggestion of dirty wet fur, ruddy dog breath, and high-pitched fear" with anxiety, which was fully intentional, as the piece was inspired by the Auschwitz doghouse. This perspective provides this work not only with its historical references, but may also suggest drawing attention to the suffering of dogs in shelters as well as to individual pain.

After its premiere the piece was presented, among others, in: Galerie Charim, Vienna, Austria (2009), Zachęta Narodowa Galeria Sztuki, Warsaw, Poland (2009–2010) and in Galerie Walter Keller, Zürich, Switzerland (2013).

=== I Hate My Body When You're Gone (2009) ===
It is a series of videos and photographs of the artist herself, exploring the theme of gender differences and identity exploration seen through violence and perverse pleasure. The artist's own interpretation of the reason to picture such violence and autoagression is that "(...) it might somehow be an aftermath of the works (…) on the concentration camps which were far more political and also dealing with violence. So it's a getting rid of the violence and coming back to life".

However, as seen in other Janich's works, the reference to WWII appears obvious here as well, as she compares concentration camp violence to relationship violence. Her piece is a controversy, as are her opinions and commentaries:

"(…) Janich is against the self-mutilation taboo with all her self. Unlike Krystian Lupa or Francis Bacon, she needs pain to survive. She holds the right to inflict it like she holds the right to get an abortion done, she asserts. It is her business. It is anybody's personal business."

— Painful works of Agnes Janich in Radom, September 2012

One of the critics commented the interrelation between acts of violence and innocence of Janich's naked body in the following way: "Her body becomes an absolute, a sacrifice, an offering. An all-encompassing declaration of: I will do everything, give everything, just to get closeness in return."

This piece was exhibited in MCCA Elektrownia, Radom, Poland, 2012 (solo, with catalog).

=== Bits and Pieces (2010) ===
It is an installation in public place, which had its premiere in Łódź – the artist's birthplace in Poland. She decided to decorate the walls of three buildings – hospital at no. 35 Łagiewnicka street and two houses at no. 14 Franciszkańska street and no. 77 Drewnowska street – with doll dresses, sleeping jumpers and children's earmuffs. The aim of the project was to bring back and preserve the memory about the youngest residents of the Łódź Ghetto "(...) that could neither move past its prison walls nor survive the war."

This work's strength lies in its simplicity:

"Such a gentle embrace of absence and potential, of the quotidian moment of a sleeping baby or a playing child. (…) A completely unexpected introduction of experience. The experience of vulnerability where earmuffs signify a tiny head in need of protection from the elements. Cold so intense it threatens to freeze the tiny child's ears. All three remnants—of play, of vulnerability, of the absent hanging bodies— are at once cheerful, even sweet but the skin they stick to (the walls of the Lodz ghetto buildings) makes them painful. One sees life as much as absence in these talismans of childhood serialized (…) into grids across the surface of the buildings."

— Thyrza Nichols Goodeve, PhD, in: Agnes Janich, Body Memory, Fotohof Edition, Salzburg, AT & MCCA Elektrownia, Radom, PL ISBN 978-3-902675-80-4

The installation was also commented: "Bits and Pieces forces us to imagine (and experience) the quotidian reality of the children that once were or might have been — parts that stand in for an absent whole."

=== That You Have Someone (2012) ===
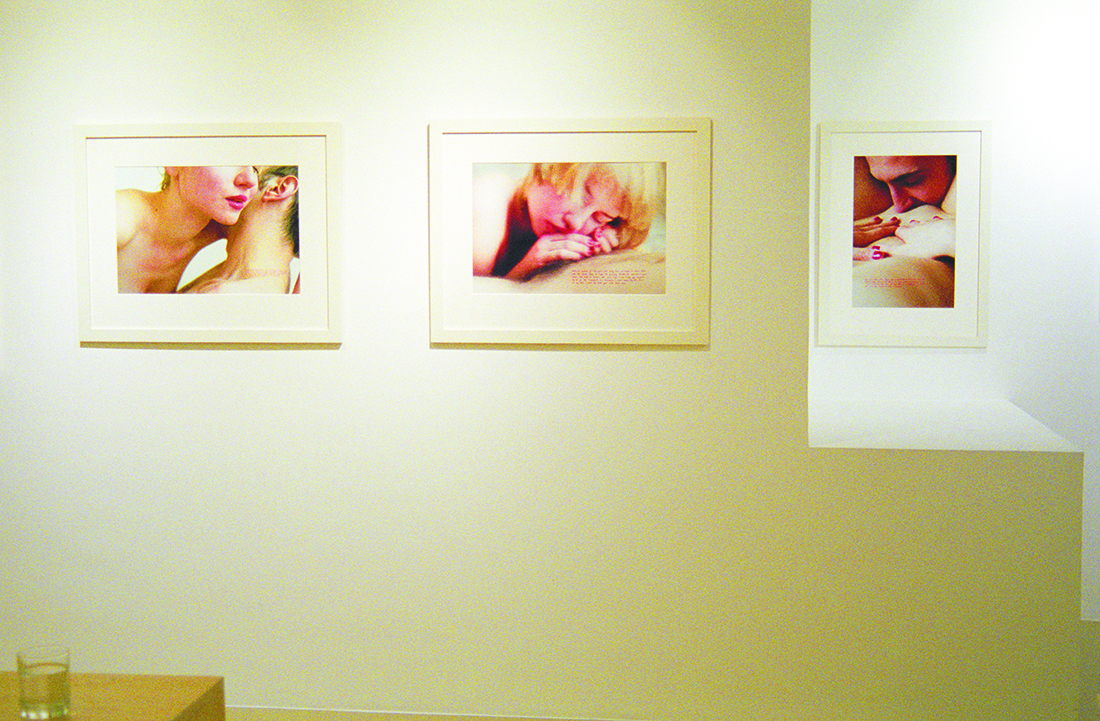
Agnes Janich's work "That You Have Someone"

It is a series of photographs depicting the artist herself involved in an erotic, intimate relation with a lover. They are archival inkjet prints on cotton rag paper, 16x24in. each. Each photograph has a description made by the artist in red ink. These are the fragments of diaries and love confessions made by the Holocaust Survivors during the WWII. In order to retrieve them, Janich has searched through the archives of Auschwitz, Mauthausen-Gusen, Majdanek, Bergen Belsen and Ravensbrück, read memoirs and talked to the Survivors in person. This piece depicts the body that "(...) becomes the subject. Nonetheless, it is not the body of the Shoah, but a body which desires, lusts, and loves. A body which had been situated outside of the frame of the historical narrative".

The piece has been exhibited among others in: Galerie Walter Keller, Zürich, Switzerland, 2013, BWA Contemporary Art Gallery, Zielona Gora, Poland, 2012 (solo) and in MCCA Elektrownia, Radom, Poland, 2012, (solo, with catalog).

=== I Don't See the Problem (2011–2015) ===
It is a series of 30 archival inkjet prints on cotton rag paper, 40x60cm / 16x20in each. They refer to social norms and clichés regulating lives of a couple. In this piece the author's idea was to describe variety of emotions and mutual expectations of the partners. As in previous works Janich provided a kind of commentary to the captured scenes in form of short, hand-written sentences in red ink.

"(…) Firstly, we have the female-male roles (he's the macho hunter while she's subjected to him; she's beautiful while he's strong). Then, the family roles (a picture of a young family with a Christmas tree, where the baby is, in fact, a doll) and "good advice" passed onto our role models by people from their social circle."

— Marta Raczek-Karcz, PhD in: Culture.pl

=== Female Favors (2015) ===
It is a series of 17 archival inkjet prints on cotton rag paper, 40x60cm / 16x20in each. This piece depicts various forms of rivalry between two women "one focused on self-fulfilment and the other on serving others."

=== List of other works ===
- Divine (2006)
- I-doll-atry (2006)
- Lighting the Night (2008)
- With Our Eyes Closed (2008-2015)
- Cleanliness is Goodliness (2009)
- My Mom's Diary (2009)
- Don't Hurt Myself (2009)
- He Fucked Her Good (2009)
- A Real Boy's Show (2009)
- I'm Not Afraid I Can Help Me (2009)
- Il suffit de passer le pont (2010)
- Don't (2010)
- 2 minutes late (2013)
- I Don't Need (2014)
- The Sound of Music (2014)
- What if (2014)
- Pink (2015)
- Home Forlorn (2016)
- See (2016)
- Sky High (2017)

== Selected exhibitions ==
- 2003 Visions of Light, Library Gallery of the University of Warsaw, Poland
- 2004 Home Atmosphere, Museum of Photography, Kraków, Poland
- 2005 pop love, Maison Europeene de la Photographie, Paris, France (group presentation)
- 2006 I-doll-atry & Divine, Atheneum, Warsaw, Poland (solo)
- 2007 Crossing Boundaries, ASEF Conference, Singapore
- 2007 Divine?, Central European House of Photography, Bratislava, Slovakia (solo)
- 2007 Divine?, Villa Straeuli, Winterthur, Switzerland (solo)
- 2007 Something Jewish, Swiss National Museum, Zurich, Switzerland
- 2008 Lightning The Night, Galerie Wyschür Weierthal, Winterthur, Switzerland (solo)
- 2008 Mentor Show, Visual Arts Gallery, New York, NY, US
- 2008 Reality Show, Fenstersprung Program, Bern, Switzerland
- 2009 All Creatures Great and Small, Zachęta National Gallery of Art, Warsaw, Poland
- 2009 Man To Man, Sharjah Biennial, Sharjah, United Arab Emirates
- 2009 I-doll-atry, Kunsttraject, Amsterdam, The Netherlands (solo)
- 2009 Garden of Innocents, BWA City Gallery, Bielsko-Biała, Poland (solo)
- 2009 Lighting the Night, Can Serrat International Art Center, Barcelona, Spain (solo)
- 2009 These Are A Few Of My Favorite Things, Galapagos Art Space, New York, US (solo)
- 2009 Man To Man, Charim Galerie, Vienna, Austria (solo)
- 2010 Bits & Pieces, Wschodnia Gallery and Bureau of Promotion of the City of Łódź, Poland (solo)
- 2010 Girl on the Corner and Don't Hurt Myself, MLAC, Rome, Italy (solo)
- 2010 Lighting the Night, Auschwitz Jewish Center, Oświęcim, Poland
- 2010 No more bad girls?, Kunsthalle Exnergasse, Vienna, Austria
- 2010 No more bad girls?, International Contemporary Art Foundation 3,14, Bergen, Norway
- 2010 50 Ways To Keep Your Lover, Galleri s.e., Bergen, Norway
- 2011 Fragile: Handle with Care, LUCCA Museum of Contemporary Art, Lucca, Italy
- 2012 Desire, Bergen Kunstmuseum, Bergen, Norway
- 2012 Fotomuseum Winterthur, Platform 2012 (group presentation)
- 2012 Cleanliness is Goodliness, Proekt Fabrika, Moscow, Russia (solo)
- 2013 Agnes Janich, Galerie Walter Keller, Zurich, Switzerland with Clair Galerie, Frankfurt and Munich, Germany, presenting Chim (solo)
- 2016 Papier, bitte, Galerie C, Neuchâtel, Switzerland
- 2016 The Way to You, Bondi Beach & the Waverley Arts Council with support of the Sky Foundation, Sydney, Australia (solo)
- 2016 Maison orpheline / Home Forlorn, Galerie C, Neuchâtel (solo)
- 2019 See / Sky High, Łaźnia Centre for Contemporary Art, Gdańsk, Poland (solo)

== Grants ==
- Polish Institute, Vienna, Artist's Grant, Vienna, Austria (2008)
- Polish Embassy in Bern Artist's Grant, Bern, Switzerland (2009)
- Polish Consulate in Barcelona Artist's Grant, Barcelona, Spain (2009)
- Bureau of Promotion of the City of Łódź, Artist's Grant, Łódź, Poland (2010)
- Polish Institute, Rome, Artist's Grant, Rome, Italy (2010)
- Polish Institute, Vienna, Artist's Grant, Vienna, Austria (2010)
- Polish Institute, Oslo, Artist's Grant, Oslo, Norway (2010)
- Polish Institute, Moscow, Artist's Grant, Moscow, Russia (2012)
- Polish Institute, Vienna, Artist's Grant, Vienna, Austria (2012)
- Polish Embassy in Helsinki Artist's Grant, Helsinki, Finland (2012)
- Polish Institute, Moscow, Artist's Grant, Moscow, Russia (2012)
- Polish Institute, Madrid, Artist's Grant, Madrid, Spain (2012)
- Consulate General of the Republic of Poland in Sydney Artist's Grant, Sydney, Australia (2016)
- Sky Foundation Artist's Grant, Sydney, Australia (2016)
- Waverley Arts Council Artist's Grant, Sydney, Australia (2016)

== Residencies ==
- Virginia Center for the Creative Arts, Artist's Residency, VA, USA (2006)
- I-Park Artist's Residency, CT, USA (2006)
- Galesburg Civic Arts Center Artist's Residency, IL, USA (2006)
- Vermont Studio Center Artist's Residency & Artist's Grant, VT, USA (2008)
- Villa Sträuli Artist's Residency, Winterthur, Switzerland (2008)
- Can Serrat International Art Center Artist's Residency & Artist's Grant, Spain (2008)
- Koli Cultural Center Artist's Residency, Koli, Finland (2010)
- Proekt Fabrika Artist's Residency, Moscow, Russia (2012)

== Other ==
- 3rd Place Award in the III National Photo Biennale, Poland (2003)
- Finalist of People's Faces Contest, Warsaw, Poland (2003)
- Representing Poland at ASEF Conference, Paris Photo, France (2005)
- Research Program, CCA Kitkayushu, Japan (2014)

== Publications ==
Monography:

- Agnes Janich. Body Memory, Mazovian Centre for Contemporary Art Elektrownia, Radom, PL & Fotohof Edition, Salzburg, Austria, ISBN 978-3-902675-80-4, ISBN 978-83-85901-91-4 (2012)

Featured in:

- 3rd Jungkunst Guidebook, Jungkunst Galerie, Winterthur, Switzerland (2008)
- Sharjah Biennial 9. Guidebook, Ed. Lara Khaldi, Sharjah Biennial, Sharjah (2009)
- Provisions. Sharjah Biennial 9. Book 1, Ed. Antonia Carver, Valerie Grove and Lara Khaldi, Bidouin and Sharjah Biennial, Dubai, OCLC 1008546398 (2009)
- Provisions. Sharjah Biennial 9. Book 2, Ed. Antonia Carver and Lara Khaldi, Bidouin and Sharjah Biennial, New York and Sharjah (2010)
- No more bad girls? Booklet, Ed. Kathrin Becker and Claudia Marion Stemberger, Kunsthalle Exnergasse, Vienna, Austria, (2010)
- No more bad girls? Ed. Kathrin Becker and Claudia Marion Stemberger, Kunsthalle Exnergasse, Vienna, Austria, ISBN 978-3-200-01861-7 (2011)
- Era New Horizons catalog, Ed. Robert Kardzis, Era New Horizons, Wrocław, Poland, ISBN 978-83-925733-9-5 (2011)
- Desire, exhibition catalog, Ed. Eli Okkenhaug, Bergen Museum of Art, Bergen, Norway, 978-82-91808-5 (2012)
- Becoming A Mother, exhibition catalog, Ed. Ana Vilenica, Belgrade, Serbia (2012)
