= Markus Miessen =

German architect and writer (born 1978)

Markus Miessen (born in Bonn, 1978) is a German architect and writer.

== Education and teaching ==
Since 2021, Markus Miessen has been Professor of Urban Regeneration at the University of Luxembourg, where he holds the Chair of the City of Esch, associated with the MARCH programme that focusses on the socio-ecological transition, repair, the spatial politics of social inequalities, participation, and governance.

In the Fall of 2024, Miessen will be Dean’s Visiting Professor at Columbia University GSAPP, New York City.

Miessen received his bachelor's degree from the Glasgow School of Art (BArch), continuing his studies at the Architectural Association in London (AADiplHons) and at the London Consortium (MRes). His PhD was completed at the Centre for Research Architecture at Goldsmiths (London) in 2015 under the supervision of Eyal Weizman.

From 2011 to 2016 Miessen held the position of Distinguished Professor in Practice at the University of Southern California, USC (Los Angeles).

Other teaching positions include Professor at HDK-Valand, Academy of Art and Design, University of Gothenburg (Sweden 2016–2020), Stiftungsprofessur for Critical Spaces Practice at the Städelschule (Frankfurt 2011–2013), guest professor at HEAD (Geneva), visiting professor at the Hochschule für Gestaltung (Karlsruhe) at the Berlage Institute (Rotterdam), and Unit Master at the Architectural Association (London 2004–2008). The Winter School Middle East was initiated by Miessen in 2008. He became a Harvard GSD Fellow in 2010.

Since 2024, Miessen is the designated representative of the University of Luxembourg to the Luxembourg High Council for Regional Planning (Conseil superieur de I'amenagement du territoire, CSAT).

== Work ==
Studio Miessen was founded in London in 2005 and has been based in Berlin since 2008, working on architectural and spatial design projects in Europe, North America, the Middle East and Asia. The studio has worked with institutional clients and collaborators such as Art Basel (Switzerland), Art Sonje Center (South Korea), b-05 Art & Cultural Centre (Germany), e-flux (USA), Government of Slovenia, Haus der Kulturen der Welt (Germany), the Serpentine Gallery (UK), Witte de With (The Netherlands), Weltkulturen Museum (Germany), Institute of Modern Art (Australia), Kunstverein in Hamburg (Germany), Biennials such as the Gwangju Biennale (2011), Performa (2009, 2011, 2013), Sydney Biennial (2016), Berlin Biennale (2016), Venice Biennale (2013), Istanbul Biennale (2014) and artists such as Hito Steyerl, Dénes Farkas, Liam Gillick, Flaka Haliti (PAM Public Art Munich), Slater Bradley and Stefanos Tsivopoulos. Major 2020s projects have included work for Tresor, T31 (TECHNO UND DIE GROSSE FREIHEIT, 2022), MUDAM (Michel Majerus Sinnmaschine, 2023), the Documentation Centre for the History of National Socialism, Munich (2022-25), and for the Bundeskunsthalle (We Capitalists, 2020, and All in! Re-Designing Democracy, 2024).

In 2006 Miessen and Hans Ulrich Obrist founded the Brutally Early Club., conducting conversational, salon-type meetings in post-public spaces at 6:30 AM in originally in London and later in Berlin, New York City and Paris.

Markus Miessen has authored books such as Crossbenching (2016, Sternberg Press), and The Nightmare of Participation (2010, Sternberg Press).

In collaboration with Nikolaus Hirsch, Markus Miessen initiated and edits the Critical Spatial Practice book series at Sternberg Press, publishing contributors including Keller Easterling, Beatriz Colomina, Chantal Mouffe, Eyal Weizman, Felicity Scott, Metahaven, Armin Linke, Trevor Paglen, Rabih Mroué and Jill Magid.

Miessen has worked as a consultant to the Government of Slovenia during their presidency of the EU Council, The European Kunsthalle (Cologne), the Dutch Foundation for Art and Public Domain (SKOR) (Amsterdam), the Serpentine Gallery (London), the European Commission and the Kosova National Art Gallery.

In 2021, a monograph of the studio's work titled Cultures of Assembly will be published (Sternberg Press, MIT Press).

== Selected books ==
- 2024 Agonistic Assemblies, Berlin: Sternberg Press, Cambridge MA: MIT Press
- 2021 Cultures of Assembly, Berlin: Sternberg Press, Cambridge MA: MIT Press
- 2020 Para-Plattformen Die Raumpolitik des Rechtspopulismus, Berlin: Merve Verlag
- 2019 Para-Platforms On the Spatial Politics of Right-Wing Populism, Berlin: Sternberg Press
- 2018 Perhaps It Is High Time for a Xeno-architecture to Match, Berlin: Sternberg Press
- 2018 14 Tage, Munich: Sorry Press
- 2018 (with Kenny Cupers) Spaces of Uncertainty Berlin Revisited, Basel: Birkhäuser
- 2016 Crossbenching, Berlin: Merve Verlag
- 2016 Crossbenching, Berlin: Sternberg Press
- 2015 (With Yann Chateigné) The Archive As a Productive Space Of Conflict, Berlin: Sternberg Press
- 2014 MOULD Cultures of Assembly, Milan: Mould Press
- 2012 Albtraum Partizipation, Berlin: Merve Verlag
- 2011 (with Andrea Phillips) Actors, Agents and Attendants Caring Culture: Art, Architecture and the Politics of Health, Berlin: Sternberg Press
- 2011 (with Patricia Reed, Kenny Cupers) Architectural Space as Agent, Fillip: Vancouver
- 2011 (with Nina Valerie Kolowratnik) Waking Up From The Nightmare of Participation, Utrecht: Expodium
- 2010 The Nightmare of Participation, Berlin: Sternberg Press
- 2009 (with Tina DiCarlo) When Economies Become Form, Rotterdam: Berlage Institute
- 2009 (Nikolaus Hirsch, Philipp Misselwitz, Matthias Görlich) Institution Building, Berlin: Sternberg Press
- 2008 East Coast Europe, Berlin: Sternberg Press
- 2007 The Violence of Participation, Berlin: Sternberg Press
- 2007 (with Shumon Basar, Antonia Carver) With/Without, Dubai: Bidoun
- 2006 (with Shumon Basar) Did Someone say Participate? An Atlas of Spatial Practice, Cambridge MA: MIT Press
- 2002 (with Kenny Cupers) Spaces of Uncertainty, Wuppertal: Müller+Busmann
