= Issandr El Amrani =

Moroccan-American political analyst and journalist

- Born: Rabat, Morocco
- Occupations: journalist and political analyst
- Website: www.arabist.net

Issandr El Amrani is a Moroccan-American political analyst, journalist and commentator who writes about Egypt and the Middle East for British, American and Middle Eastern publications.

El Amrani was born in Rabat, Morocco, and has lived in Cairo since 2000. He was an editor of the now defunct Cairo Times and co-founder of Cairo magazine. From 2007 to 2009 he was the North Africa analyst for the International Crisis Group, an independent non-profit organization that works to prevent, manage, and resolve deadly conflict. He was the Cairo correspondent for Middle East International (MEI), and writes for The Economist, the Financial Times, the London Review of Books, Foreign Policy, The National, Bidoun and other publications. He writes a weekly column for Al-Masry Al-Youm, an independent Egyptian newspaper. He also regularly appears as a commentator on Middle Eastern affairs on television, notably on Al-Jazeera English, and conducts private consulting on the politics of the Middle East.

He is transitioning to Amman, where he and Ursula Lindsey, his wife, are residing with their son Milo.
