= Demotix =

UK photo agency

- Website type: Pictures, Videos, News, Journalism, Image Sales
- Headquarters: London, UK
- Owner: Corbis Images
- Commercial: Yes
- Launched: January 2009

Demotix was a photo agency that enabled freelance photojournalists to license their photos to mainstream media organisations, charities, and stock image buyers.

Initially conceived as a free speech platform to allow local journalists to report their own stories to a global audience, the company was launched in January 2009 by CEO Turi Munthe (Founder Parlia) and COO Jonathan Tepper and was based in London, UK.

== History ==
Demotix opened in beta in July 2008 and launched publicly in January 2009. The agency was previously to be known as "Nyouz", but this name was discarded in favour of Demotix.

Since its foundation, Demotix has announced partnership agreements with a variety of other news organisations, including Global Voices Online, the Press Association, and Corbis Images. Demotix has also partnered with The Huffington Post, The Daily Telegraph and Le Monde as well as Future TV in Lebanon, the Himalayan Times and elsewhere around the globe.

In August 2011, Demotix CEO Turi Munthe announced that it had accepted an undisclosed investment from Corbis, following on from the media distribution agreement the two companies had arrived at in March of the same year.

Demotix was acquired by Corbis Corporation in November 2012. Shortly thereafter editor-in-chief Corey Pein quit in protest of Corbis's treatment of freelance photographers.

=== Notable stories and scoops ===
Demotix has been particularly successful at covering news the mainstream media cannot reach, and came to prominence with its user-generated reporting from the 2008–2009 Israel–Gaza conflict, and its in-depth coverage of the G20 protests in London including an image of Ian Tomlinson who died at the event.

==== Iran elections ====
In June 2009, during protests over the disputed presidential election in Iran, the Iranian government imposed sanctions on all foreign media, preventing them from documenting the protests. However, Demotix contributors, based in Iran, defied this media crackdown to upload hundreds of images onto the Demotix website illustrating the violent street-battles and civil unrest. The strategy delivered in Iran, with Demotix offering pictures that can’t be matched by the mainstream media. The coverage was syndicated by a number of agencies such as Reuters, Agence France Presse, European Pressphoto Agency, The New York Times, the UK's The Daily Telegraph, El País and a range of other newspapers.

On Wednesday, June 17, Demotix reported one of its reporters had been arrested and his camera seized in Iran. On Thursday, June 25, Demotix commissioning editor Andy Heath reported, "We've just heard that the Demotix contributor who was arrested last week by the Iranian police will not face further remember inquiries and has had his camera returned to him by officials."

On Saturday, June 20, Demotix received some of the only photos of the violence in Tehran, where authorities were shown to use tear gas against protesters. These images were licensed to a number of outlets, including US newspaper The New York Times, the UK's The Daily Telegraph and Spain's El País.

==== The 9/11 Wars ====
Demotix continues to receive contributions from countries that became the focus of military intervention, invasion, or Al-Qaeda and Taliban activity in the years following the September 11, 2001 attacks, including Afghanistan, Iraq and Pakistan

==== 2011 “Arab Spring” uprisings ====
Participants in and observers of the Arab Spring uprisings across the Middle East and North Africa have uploaded content to Demotix. Contributions were submitted from countries including Egypt, Tunisia and Libya in North Africa.

In the Persian Gulf and Arabian Peninsula, there were submissions from Yemen and Bahrain.

==== 2011 Norway attacks ====
Among the first on the scene of the bombs detonated in central Oslo in July 2011 were Demotix contributors, capturing some graphic images of the aftermath of the explosions. Their photos were among the first to show that the bombs had had fatal casualties.

==== 2011 UK riots ====
Many photographers submitted their images of the rioting that broke out across the UK in August 2011, as well as material illustrating the spontaneous cleanup movements which followed them.

The agency also noted in blog posts that several contributors had come under attack by rioters.

== Sale of Corbis Images to Visual China Group, January 2016. ==
On January 22, 2016, all pages at the Demotix website were redirected to the home page of Corbis Images, where an announcement and some FAQs about the sale of Corbis Images to Visual China Group appeared. Simultaneously Visual China Group/Getty announced on their websites the acquisition of Corbis Images by VCG and the licensing arrangement with Getty.

== Awards and recognition ==
Demotix has won or been nominated for numerous awards.

The agency won the Media Guardian Innovation Award for Independent Media in 2009. The agency was also awarded a British Airways Opportunity Grant in 2010, a Webby award in the "News" category in 2011 and was nominated to the TechMedia Invest 100 2009.

Demotix has been nominated at the SXSW Awards 2009, in the Community and People's Choice categories, the Mashable Open Web Awards 2009 in the Political News category, and the Knight-Batten Awards for Innovation in Journalism, 2009.

== Controversy ==
Demotix came under criticism in the United Kingdom by the National Union of Journalists and UK Press Card Authority for issuing its own press pass that was similar in design to the official UK press card, but not recognised by the official bodies and without the same checks or criteria for issuing one.

Demotix defended their decision saying "We've verified each and every one, they've written 10 or more stories. We're careful about the people we accredit, we're responsible".
