= Sami Mohammad =

Kuwaiti sculptor and artist (1943–2026)

- سامي محمد
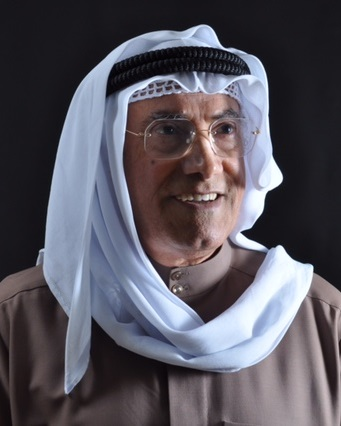
- Born: 1 October 1943; Kuwait
- Died: 11 August 2026 (aged 82)
- Notable work: Sabra and Chantila; Hunger; Mother
- Website: mohammed-art.com

Sami Mohammad Ahmed Saleh (Arabic: سامي محمد أحمد الصالح; 1 October 1943 – 11 August 2026) was a Kuwaiti sculptor and artist. He was most known for his bronze sculptures. Most of his artwork deals with the ideas of freedom, oppression, genocide and suffering. In 1971, he was commissioned to make a statue of Abdullah Al-Salim Al-Sabah. He is most known for his Box series, Sabra and Chantila, Hunger and Mother.

Mohammad's work was presented at the 55th Venice Biennale in 2013, which was the first time Kuwait participated in the event. He wrote a book about his work and career, entitled The Art of Sami Mohammad, which was published in 1995.

== Early life and education ==
Mohammad was born in Kuwait on 1 October 1943. His father was a tailor. As a child, he liked playing with clay and made forms that looked like birds and animals and sold them to his friends. When he was a student at Sabaah School, he helped in creating statues for a school project for commemorating the battle of Port Said and Port Fouad. At the inauguration of the display, he was awarded first prize by Sheikh Abdullah Al Jaber Al Sabah, the General Director of education department.

When Mohammad was of 20 years, he left the school to start working at the Ministry of Interior. At the same time, The Free Atelier was formed, that provided art material and tutoring free of charge to the students. The Ministry of Education, which officially administers the Atelier as one of its institutional units, granted him a lifelong stipend. As a stipendiary he acquired studio space at The Free Atelier. He joined the Atelier and went to the Atelier regularly. During those years, he read avidly about the works of Michelangelo, Leonardo da Vinci, Raphael and Gian Lorenzo Bernini, which influenced the early works in his career.

In 1966, he received a government scholarship to Egypt to study at the College of Fine Arts in Cairo, a college of fine arts and completed his degree in 1970. In 1967, he co-founded the Kuwaiti Society of Formative Artists. In 1973, Mohammad got a scholarship for a course of study in the USA to study at the College of Fine Arts in San Francisco. He spent his first year at the Vermont college to improve his English language. Following the course at Vermont, instead of joining College of Fine Arts, he went to Johnson Institute for artists in Princeton. It was at this institute that he started working with bronze casting and other mediums and techniques.

== Career ==
Before leaving for the USA to study further, The Kuwaiti University deputized him as a visiting artist to teach tutorials in visual arts. While Mohammad was in the USA, he started working on his first major collection called Curves. After completing his education, he returned to Kuwait in 1976. On his return, he started working on Before birth, "After birth" and "Motherhood". In 1978, he was selected to represent Kuwait at the Kuwaiti Artists Exhibition in Paris and later represented Kuwait at the Tenth International Sculpture conference held in Toronto. Upon returning from the conference, he began work on his Box series and subsequently started focusing on mankind and humans as the subject of his sculptures and arts.

Mohammad held his first travelling exhibition in 1994, which included both paintings and sculptures. The exhibition opened in Sharjah, organized by Department of Culture and Information, Directorate of Arts, then moved to Abu Dhabi, Kuwait, Italy and participated in Bodova International Biennial on sculpture. Mohammad closed his studio at The Free Atelier in 1999.

The National Council for Culture, Arts and Letters commissioned him to design the State of Kuwait Merit Award Trophy and was later commissioned to design and execute the golden medal and trophy of The National Achievement Award. In the early 2000s, The Museum of Contemporary Art in Sharjah dedicated a separate wing for his artworks which are exhibited on long-term basis.

Mohammad's work was presented at 55th Venice Biennale in 2013, the first time that Kuwait participated in the event. Titled "National Works" and curated by Ala Younis, the pavilion's show featured a bronze bust of Sheikh Abdullah Al-Salem Al-Sabah, a fiberglass copy of the extended arm of Sheikh Sabah Al-Salem Al-Sabah (1989), in addition to series of drawings and photographs excavated from the Mohammad's studio. Both works were references produced for unique pieces produced by the artist in previous commissions in 1971 and 1988 respectively.

== Works ==
The subject of most of Mohammad's work has been human and Arab revolution. In the beginning of his career, he was involved in making life-size sculptures. Some of the important ones included Ibn Rushd (1964) and Al-Khalil Bin Ahmad (1965). Mohammad often made sculptures that were related to the crisis of the time. In 1983, he made Sabra and Shatila, expressing the pain of Sabra and Shatila massacre and before that he made sculptures relating to the Crisis in the Cairo in 1970's.

Mohammad started working on Boxes series, in 1979, which became one of his major works. Other important works by him included the Shackled series, which were paintings and drawings in Chinese ink on paper and the Call for Help series, The Sailor (1964) and Mother (1968). After returning from the US, his art changed considerably, having been influenced by the Western artist. Upon returning from the US, he started studying other artists' work and sought to find new ways of expression.

=== Sabra and Shatila ===
Sabra and Shatila is a sculpture made by Mohammad in 1983 after the Sabra and Shatila massacres. It was the subject of a paper written by Zahra Hussein in 2010. The sculpture shows a man on a block who is blindfolded and appears to be writhing in pain. Hussein wrote in her paper that "his form is simple yet highly polysemous. In Sabra and Shatila, the barely alive single, recumbent body bound by incising, torturous fetters stands for a people. Mohammad's Sabra and Shatila does what the media images and abstract art regularly decline to do. It Solemnizes its narrative dimension, merges the secular and the sacred and engages in the critique of Political Darwinism."

=== Statue of Abdullah Al-Salem Al-Sabah ===
Mohammad was commissioned by Al-Aam Newspaper in 1971 to make a statue of Sheikh Abdullah Al-Salem Al-Sabah, who was the ruler of Kuwait from 1950 to 1965. The statues was made of Bronze and completed in 1972. While discussing, Mohammad's work, Arab Times wrote that "the pose the artist chose for his creation and the expression on the face of the Amir reveals the noble bearing of the man he was..." and called it "one of the most important works" by Mohammad. Later, Mohammad also made the statue of Sabah Al-Salem Al-Sabah. Both these statues were presented at 55th Venice Biennale.

=== Hunger ===
In 1970, Mohmmad made Hunger, which is a sculpture that shows a mother and a child, all skin and bones. The sculpture was modelled of synthetic marble. It was called the "true epitome of hunger and starving humanity" by the Arab Times.

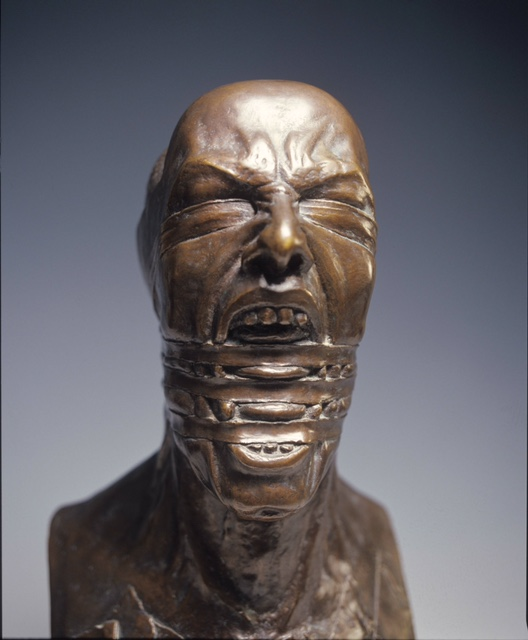
Paralysis and Resistance (1980)

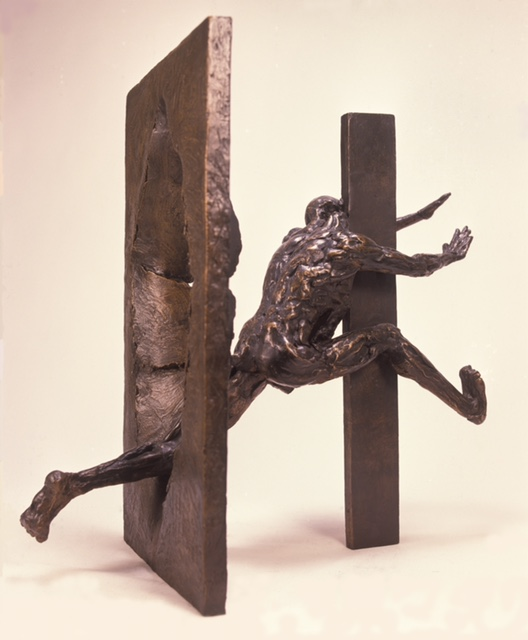
The Penetration (1989)

== Death ==
Mohammad died on 11 August 2026, at the age of 82.

== Artistry and style ==
The subject of majority of work by Mohammad has been humans and the Arab revolution. The topics for his sculptures surround the ideas of oppression, genocide and suffering. He has made many sculptures that were about the tragedies of his time: the tragedy of Sabra and Chatila, political oppression, economic difficulties and human aggressiveness. An article published in Al-Watan in 1985 wrote than "Sami has always been faithful to the subjects of his sculpting: humanity and the Arab revolutionary. In this, he is considered a follower of Iraqi school of art sculpture. However, in his style, he belongs to the gulf school. Nevertheless, he has maintained his own steady and prevailing style."

His art has been influenced by the Arab awakening of the 70's and the liberalism that came about subsequently. A paper analysing, the work of Mohammad wrote that "in his early career, Mohammad enjoyed the benefits of the Arab awakenings liberalism and sculpted life size male and female figures in nude, seminude categories. Later, in his mature years, he witnessed the dwindling support for art when less liberal ideologies ascended politically and the exuberant culture climate, brought about by the ideals of Arab awakening and Arab nationals, waned." After returning from the US, his art changed considerably, having been influenced by the Western artist. Upon returning from the US, he started studying other artists' work and sought to find new ways of expression.

Freedom is yet another important concept in the art of Mohammad. A paper about his art discussed that "...his visual art suggests that the sign of the buoyancy of culture is the conviction that the underpinning logos should be freedom–and most specifically, free speech..."

== Publications ==
In 1995, Mohammad published his first and only book, The Art of Sami Mohammad, a bilingual Arabic-English book which traces the development of his career.

Mohammad has also been the subject of multiple publications. In 2004, Sami Mohammad and the Semiotics of Abstraction was published that discussed his artwork and style in great detail. In 2010, a paper entitled Aesthetics of Memorialization: The Sabra and Shatila Genocide in the Work of Sami Mohammad, Jean Genet, And June Jordan discussed his Sabra and Shatila. His work was the subject of The Prometheus Myth in the Sculptures of Sami Mohammad and the Plays of Aeschylus and Shelley, a paper published in 2012, that explored semiosis in four of his works Paralysis and Resistance (1980), The Challenge (1983), The Tied Man (1989), and The Earthquake (1990).

He was interviewed by Selections Magazine and was published in their Winter 2018 issues titled "Sanctuaries". In this, he talks about his studio and artist life along with his influences.

Longing for Eternity: One Century of Modern and Contemporary Iraqi Art, Skira, Milan 2014.

== Reception ==
Mohammad's work has received critical acclaim in Kuwait as well as internationally. His work has received considerable media attention. In a series of articles about Mohammad's life, the Arab Times wrote that "Sami is an artist deeply involved in the human saga. Everything that spells tragedy and suffering interests him."

In September 1987, the Al-Arabi Magazine while reviewing his work wrote that, "one of the most important elements that gave the formative works of Sami Mohammad a considerable degree of steadiness and strength is his full commitment to the creation of visual and intellectual connection between one artistic step and other." Mohammad has often been called one of the most important artists in Kuwait. The Al-Quds Al-Arabi called him "the most prominent aspect in formative art in Kuwait and the Arab world." The Kul al-Arab called his work "noisily eloquent" and "his sculptures are the result of a deep understanding of the feeling and suffering of the viewer". Jabra Ibrahim Jabra, has said "his works are worthy of being displayed in the lobbies and corridors of the United Nations Building in New York and of the UNESCO in Paris."

== Selected awards and honours ==
- 1984 – First prize in First Cairo Art Biennial
- 1988 – First prize at the Kuwait General Exhibition
- 1988 – First prize at the Gulf Corporation Council (GCC) Art Biennial
- State of Kuwait National Merit Award, given by the National Council for Culture, Arts and Letters
