= Turi Munthe =

Anglo French Journalist

- Born: 1976 (age 49–50); Rome, Italy
- Occupations: Journalist, Entrepreneur

Turi Munthe FRSA (born 1976) is an Anglo-French journalist and entrepreneur. He is the founder of Demotix, which became the largest network of photojournalists in the world, as well as Parlia, an encyclopaedia of opinion.

== Education ==
Munthe studied Arabic and History at Oxford, Hebrew at the Hebrew University of Jerusalem, and dropped out of a PhD at NYU in Anthropology of Religion to start a (failed) biofuels business in Ghana.

== Work ==
Munthe began his career with IBTauris, while writing for the British and US press on Middle East politics. He published The Saddam Hussein Reader, before covering the 2nd Gulf War as a freelance journalist. He then launched The Beirut Review, a cultural magazine published with the Daily Star under Rami Khouri, before returning to London as Head of the Middle East Programme at the Royal United Services Institute.

In late 2007, he founded Demotix with Jonathan Tepper. Demotix built a network of 75,000 contributors around the world and exited to Corbis Corporation in 2012. Munthe joined Marcus Brauchli and Sasa Vucinic’s North Base Media as a Venture Partner in 2015, before founding Parlia in 2019. In 2015, he co-curated the Global Art Forum with Sultan al-Qassemi and Shumon Basar.

Munthe has lectured on new media all over the world, and has made regular news appearances. He sits on the boards of openDemocracy, The New Humanitarian and The Signals Network, and has been a trustee of Index on Censorship and The Bureau for Investigative Journalism. He sits on the board of GEDI Gruppo Editoriale, the largest newspaper conglomerate in Italy.
