= De Appel =

Contemporary arts centre in Amsterdam, Netherlands

de Appel
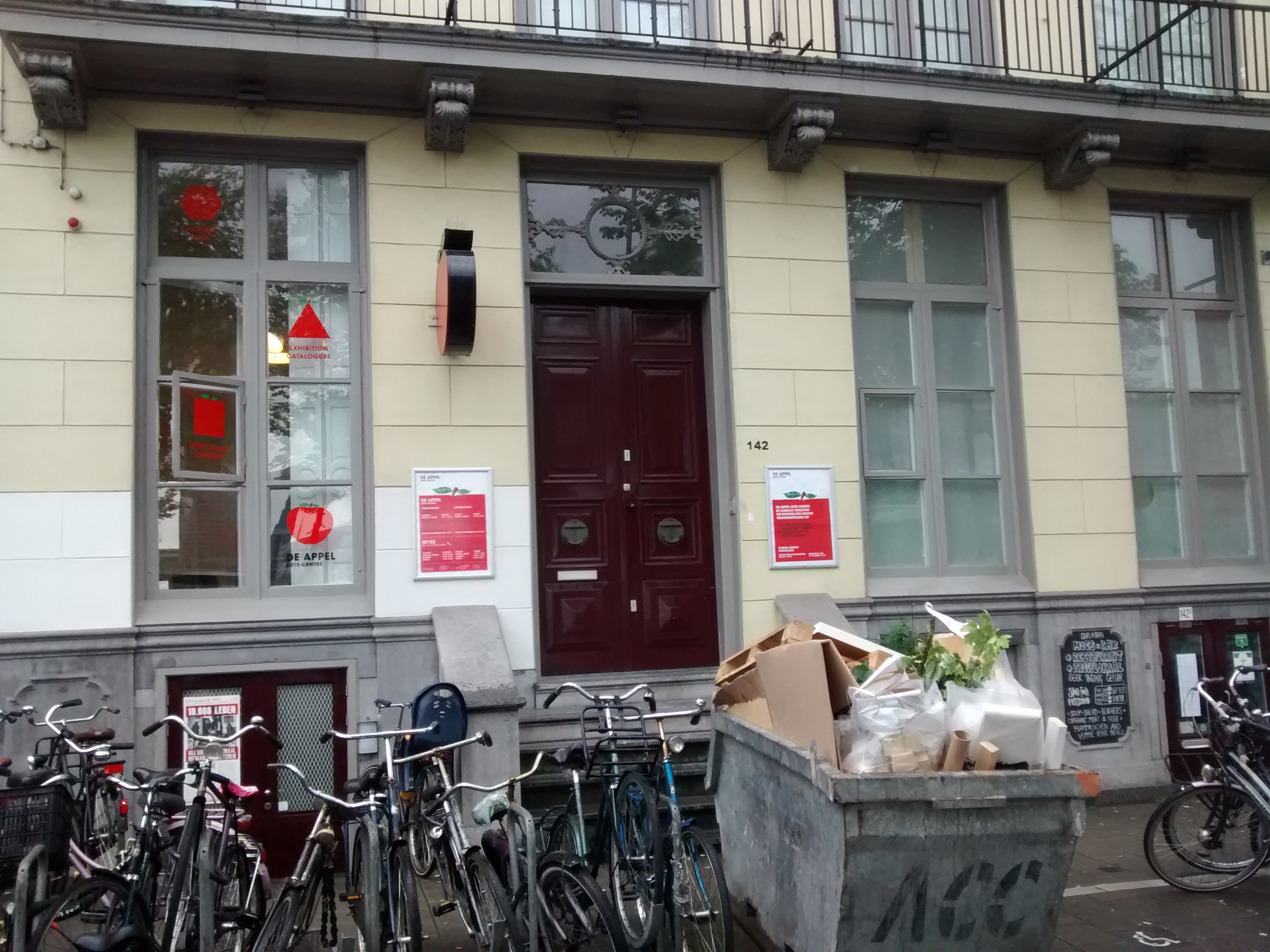
- de Appel Facade.
- Established: 1975
- Location: Schipluidenlaan 12; Amsterdam, Netherlands
- Coordinates: 52.3734°N 4.9062°E
- Type: Arts centre
- Accreditation: ICOM, Official Museums of Amsterdam
- Visitors: 18.672 (2014)
- Director: Lara Khaldi
- Website: http://deappel.nl/

de Appel is a contemporary arts centre, located in Amsterdam. Since it was founded in 1975 by Wies Smals, the goal of de Appel is to function as a stage for research and presentation of visual arts. Exhibitions, publications and discursive events are the main activities of de Appel.

In 1994, Saskia Bos established an intensive course, called 'The Curatorial Programme'. Over a period of eight months a selective group of five to six people are trained to become a curator. At the end of 2012, former director Ann Demeester initiated a new professional development programme in collaboration with The Fair Gallery: the Gallerist programme. This programme was the first practice-oriented educational course for (aspiring) gallery owners and (young) art professionals who wanted to deepen their curatorial and business competencies in the commercial segment of the art world.

In 2023 Lara Khaldi was appointed director.

== Former directors ==
- Wies Smals
- Saskia Bos
- Ann Demeester
- Lorenzo Benedetti
- Monika Szewczyk
