= Yasmine El Rashidi =

Egyptian writer

- Born: 1977 (age 48–49)
- Citizenship: Egypt
- Occupations: Writer, author

Yasmine El Rashidi (Arabic: ياسمين الرشيدي; born 1977) is an Egyptian author. She is the author of The Battle for Egypt: Dispatches from the Revolution and Chronicle of a Last Summer: A Novel of Egypt, a coming-of-age novel set in 1984 in Cairo that was long-listed for the 2017 PEN Open Book Award. She is a regular contributor to The New York Review of Books, and a contributing editor to the Middle East arts and culture quarterly Bidoun. She is a contributing opinion writer for The New York Times.

== Selected works ==
=== Novels ===
- Chronicle of a Last Summer: A Novel of Egypt. 2016.

=== Non-fiction ===
- The Battle for Egypt: Dispatches from the Revolution. 2011.
- — (February 22, 2018). "Toughing it out in Cairo". The New York Review of Books. 65 (3): 44–46.
- Laughter in the Dark: Egypt to the Tune of Change. 2023.
