= Lara Khaldi =

Palestinian gallery director

- لارا الخالدي
- Born: Jerusalem
- Occupation: Director of de Appel

Lara Khaldi (Arabic: لارا الخالدي) is a Palestinian museum director and cultural producer, who is director of de Appel, a contemporary art centre in the Netherlands. In 2019 she was selected as one of Apollo magazine's '40 under 40 Middle East Thinkers'.

== Early life, education and career ==
Born in Jerusalem, Khaldi was educated at the European Graduate School, Saas-Fee, Switzerland. She is also an alumna of the de Appel curatorial programme in Amsterdam.

A former head of Media Studies at Alquds Bard College, she previously taught art history at Birzeit University, and was a tutor at the Sandberg Institute. She also worked as deputy director at Sharjah Art Foundation and director of Khalil Sakakini Cultural Centre in Ramallah.

In 2017, Khaldi served as the interlocutor for “Shifting Ground,” the Ramallah off-site project of Sharjah Biennial 13 (SB13), curated by Christine Tohme.

Her curatorial practice has included collaborations with many artists and practitioners, including Bojana Cvejić, Noor Abed, Yazan Khalili, and José A. Sánchez. In 2023 she was appointed director of de Appel, a contemporary art centre in the Netherlands.

In 2019 she was selected as one of Apollo magazine's '40 under 40 Middle East Thinkers'.
