= Keller Easterling =

American architect

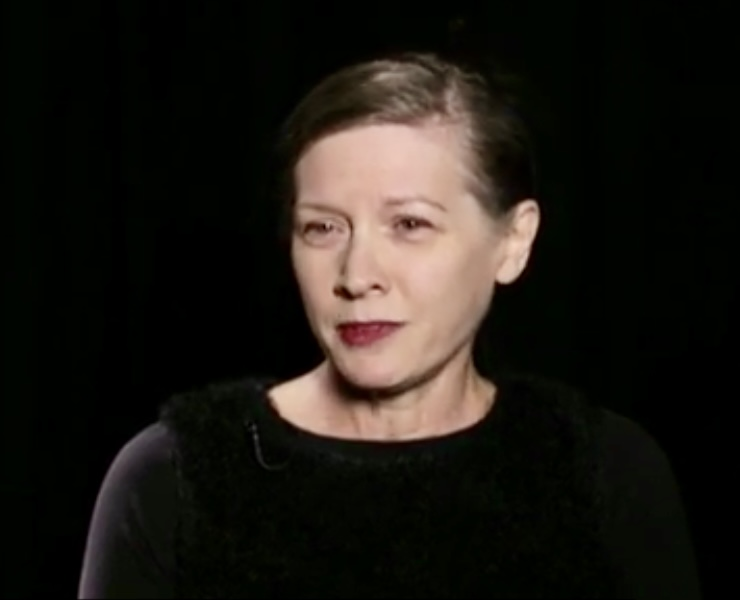
- Easterling on The Laura Flanders Show in 2015
- Education: Princeton University (B.S., M.A.)
- Occupation: Architect - Professor
- Website: http://kellereasterling.com/

Keller Easterling is an architect, writer, and the Enid Storm Dwyer Professor of Architecture at Yale University, where she is also the Director of the Master of Environmental Design (M.E.D.) program. Her work often describes spatial infrastructures that impact architectural and social outcomes and the means, as a form of activism, to influence them.

== Works ==
Easterling's newest book Medium Design: Knowing How to Work on the World (Verso, 2021) rethinks approaches to temper power structures driving climate crisis, inequality, and other entrenched conditions. Her preceding book, Extrastatecraft: The Power of Infrastructure Space (Verso, 2014), seeks to make visible the invisible rules of infrastructure that order the built and social spaces of everyday existence.

Her preceding book, Enduring Innocence: Global Architecture and its Political Masquerades (MIT, 2005) won Yale's Gustav Ranis Award for best faculty book, and Archinect's best book of 2005. In it she examines heterotopic spatial conditions such as cruise ship tourism in North Korea, agricultural formations in Spain, spiritual organizations, golf courses, automated global ports, and South Asian IT enclaves as examples of “nonnational sovereignty.” In the year following its publication, Easterling was granted tenure at Yale where she teaches a university-wide lecture course that positions spatial fluency as an essential component of general education.

Additional works include Organization Space: Landscapes, Highways and Houses in America (MIT, 1999) and Subtraction (Sternberg, 2014).

Her work has been exhibited internationally and recognized with numerous awards. In 2019, Easterling was named a United States Artists Fellow in Architecture and Design and received the Blueprint Award for Critical Thinking. The preceding year, she exhibited MANY, a commissioned exhibition for the 2018 Venice Architecture Biennale that showcased “a digital mobility commons to facilitate global migration through an exchange of needs.” For the 2014 Venice Architectural Biennale, Elements, curated by Rem Koolhaas, Easterling supplied Floor, alternative histories and futures for surfaces underfoot.

Easterling's work extends across multiple media formats, combining design research, writing, and digital experimentation, exhibitions, and web installations. In 1992 she co-authored a laserdisc on the history of suburbia in the US from 1934 to 1960 entitled Call it Home: The House that Private Enterprise Built (with Richard Prelinger). Her web installations include: ATTTNT: Land Reparations Infrastructure, Extrastatecraft, Wildcards: a Game of Orgman, and Highline: Plotting NYC.

Exhibiting internationally, Easterling's work has been shown at the Henry Art Gallery, the Istanbul Design Biennale, Storefront for Art and Architecture, the Rotterdam Biennale, the Queens Museum, and the Architectural League. She has lectured and published widely in the United States and abroad, contributing to journals such as Domus, Artforum, Grey Room, Cabinet, Volume, Assemblage, e-flux, Log, Praxis, Harvard Design Magazine, Perspecta, and ANY.

Easterling's most recent book project, Your Land, examines land activism after the civil rights movement and the attempts to forestall and reverse the precipitous drop in Black land ownership in the 20th century. In parallel, Easterling is collaborating with Historically Black Colleges and Universities (HBCUs) on cooperatives, urban farming, land activism, and reparations projects supported in part by grants from Yale's ASCEND program.

== Books ==
- Medium Design: Knowing How to Work on the World (Verso, 2021)
- Extrastatecraft: The power of infrastructure space (Verso, 2014)
- Subtraction (Sternberg Press, 2014)
- Enduring Innocence: Global Architecture and its Political Masquerades (MIT Press, 2005)
- Organization Space: Landscapes, Highways and Houses in America (MIT, 10999)

== Discs/DVDs ==
- Call It Home: The house that private enterprise built (Voyager Press, 1992) (with Richard Prelinger)

== Exhibitions ==
- Seoul Biennale for Architecture and Urbanism, September 2019
- MANY, US Pavilion, 2018 Venice Architecture Biennale, May 2018
- Venice Biennale with OMA/AMO, Floor, Central Pavilion Elements Exhibition, 2014
- Gift City, Test Site, Henry Art Gallery, Seattle, Washington. 2016
- Some True Stories, Storefront for Art and Architecture, New York. 2008
- Envisioning Power, “Corporate City” Rotterdam Biennale. 2007

== Papers ==
- “Maybe Something More Like Disposition,” e-flux.
- “Trust Land,” Public Culture, May.
- “Old New Deal,” Non Extractive Architecture (V-A-C Press).
- “No Normal,” Quartz, June 20.
- “Zone: The Spatial Softwares of Extrastatecraft,” Places Journal.

== TV/webcasts ==
- New Models, Interview, May 13, 2021
