= Maha Maamoun =

Egyptian artist

- Born: 1972 (age 53–54); Oakland, California
- Known for: Egyptian award-winning visual artist

Maha Maamoun (born 1972, Oakland, California), is an Egyptian award-winning visual artist and curator based in Cairo. She is a founding board member of the Contemporary Image Collective (CiC), an independent non-profit space for art and culture founded in Cairo in 2004. She also co-founded the independent publishing platform called Kayfa-ta in 2013. She was awarded the Jury Prize for her film Domestic Tourism II at Sharjah Biennal 9 (2009). Maamoun is a fellow of the Academy of the Arts of the World.

== Life ==
Maha Maamoun was born in Oakland, California in 1972 and grew up in Cairo. She studied Economics and received an MA in Middle Eastern History. In 2004 Maamoun co-founded the independent non-profit space for art and culture: Contemporary Image Collective (CiC) in Cairo. Besides her artistic practice in photography and video, she collaborates on independent publishing and curatorial projects. Maamoun was the co-curator of International Visual Arts Festival PhotoCairo3 in Cairo in 2005 and assistant curator for Meeting Points 5 in Berlin in 2007.

In 2018, Maha Maamoun joined the Forum Expanded (Berlinale) curatorial team. The same year she co-founded Kayfa-ta, a non-profit Arabic publishing initiative. In 2014 she curated shows at Sharjah Art Gallery at the American University of Cairo and film program in Wiener Festwochen at Künstlerhaus in Vienna.

In 2018 Maamoun for the first time joined the 68th Berlin International Film Festival, Berlinale, as a part of curatorial team of "Forum Expanded". The same year she moderated ‘Projections’ panel discussion on independent cinema and screening platforms during the 2018 March Meeting in Sharjah.

Currently Maamoun co-curates the exhibition How to Maneuver: Shape-Shifting Texts and Other Publishing Tactics that takes place at Warehouse421 in Abu Dhabi till 16 February 2020.

== Artistic style ==
Maamoun works primarily with video and photography that address the form and function of images in mainstream culture. She is interested in social conditioning and how the visual presentation of places and environments is expanded to appeal to different audiences. She claims that common visual and literary images form the cultural environment that we weave and are weaved into. Her work deals with circulation and function of images in vernacular culture, reframing these as tools for critical insights and analysis. Maamoun’s work acts as a lens through which we see familiar images in novel and insightful ways.

Her recent video works consider the capacity of images to function critically in a variety of political, social and cultural contexts. Maamoun is specifically interested in urban fabric of her home city Cairo, drawing attention in her photographic works to the visual contradictions that surround her. Her generic visual representations of Cairo explore how images intersect with, and are negotiated by, personal experiences. She reflects on generic and overused national symbols and the ways in which they have been appropriated to construct personal narratives and collective histories. Since 2007 she is working on projects that take as their starting point the Pyramids of Giza as a visual and literary image.

== Works ==
=== Domestic Tourism I (2005) ===
Domestic Tourism I is the photographic series where the genres of touristic images of Egypt provided a formal reference for actually exploring a more psychological experience of the city. These digitally manipulated images present more complicated, less-sellable and slightly uncomfortable images that comment on the Egypt consumed locally.

Domestic Tourism I consists of four images: Beach, Cairo by Night, Felucca and Park.

Domestic Tourism I: Beach depicts bathers at Alexandria’s famous Stanley Bridge where the density of the crowd in the water and the bathers’ conservative dress indicates that the fortunes of the private-access beach have changed and the coastal city’s celebrated cosmopolitanism ceded to a resolutely lower middle class, Egyptian populace.

Domestic Tourism: Cairo by Night offers a noctural view of one of the capital’s major Nile bridges where then-President Mubarak’s disembodied smile replaces the ads on many of the illuminated signboards lining the streets, recalling the former president’s irreverent popular alias: la vache qui rit (the laughing cow) and his rapacious neo-liberal economic policies.

Domestic Tourism I: Felucca presents a touristic image of an eponymous sail boat plying the Nile with carnivalesque landscape of signboards celebrating then-President Mubarak in the background.

Domestic Tourism I: Park depicts young couples huddled on benches in front of the state headquarters for public administration at one end of Tahrir Square, at the symbolic heart of the capital and the site, six years later, of Egypt’s 2011 revolution. The street lights with an abnormal intensity in the daytime scene and the oversaturated color of well-worn grass and strangled foliage looks unnatural in this notoriously polluted urban hub.

Domestic Tourism I has been acquired by the Metropolitan Museum of New York.

=== Domestic Tourism II (2009) ===
The film Domestic Tourism II, produced and commissioned by Sharjah Biennal 9, combines scenes from Egyptian films with the Pyramids as backdrop, examining narratives of recent history. NY Times called the film "a funny, feature-length shout-out to the Great Pyramid of Giza".

To create Domestic Tourism II Maamoun looked for films that had a scene with the pyramids to see how different their cinematic representations are, and how they are implicated in the Cairo’s ongoing negotiations and active struggle over the past and present. She discovered that a lot of the scenes by the pyramids are quite politically charged and tied to distinct chapters in Egypt’s modern history. The film starts with the most recent scenes, descends back to the oldest scene, and then ascends up again to the present. Such chronology gives the film its emotional structure and rhythm as the drama engulfing the pyramids gradually rises and falls with time. The film was awarded a Biennal Jury Prize.

=== 2026 (2010) ===
The video 2026 was shot a year before the revolution of 2011 imagining time-travel and upheaval, before the events in Tahrir Square began. The video disorients bridging together images and stories from the French and Egyptian time-travellers. The afterlife of 2026 in the Egyptian political context lends an additional resonance. Viewed today, the video appears to foretell real-world events by narrating a scene set on the threshold of fictional revolution. 2026 has now been acquired by the Metropolitan Museum of Art in New York.

=== Night Visitor: The Night of Counting the Years (2011) ===
The film Night Visitor: The Night of Counting the Years, compiled from mobile phone footage posted on YouTube, documents the break-in at the State Security buildings in Cairo and Damanhur in 2011. It takes us through previously impenetrable structures, from secret prisons up to lavish offices of government officials.

=== Dear Animal (2016) ===
The film was shot between Cairo and different locations in India weaves together a story by writer Haytham El-Wardany "Lord of the Order of Existence" about a drug dealer who turns into a strange animal, and a selection of letters written by Azza Shaaban, a director-producer involved with the Egyptian revolution who now lives in India, from where she sends notes about her travel and healing process after the revolution. The films moves back and forth between cinematic story by El-Wardany, filmed in Cairo, and the scenes produced with Shaaban in India where is reads a selection of her letters, the camera moving between her and her private and public surroundings.

Occupying disparate temporal and spatial registers, Dear Animal aimed to raise thoughts about our relationship to power, violence, and the unfamiliar. The film suggests power relations were so up-ended by the revolution that people even started questioning the categories that separate animals from human. Dear Animal was in The Short Film program at Art Basel film festival in 2017 and was named in highlights of the festival by CNN. It was also shown at the Sharjah Art Foundation in 2016.

=== Subduer (2017) ===
The title of the film - The Subduer - is a reference to one of the ’99 most beautiful names of Allah’ in Islamic tradition. The film appeared as a result of a regular visit by Maamoun to one of the many public notary offices in Egypt when she saw state functionaries saying prayers from soiled and aging sheets of paper. Calling to our higher selves, our finer temperaments, our sense of forgiveness, and reminding us of the brevity of this material world, these prayers project a parallel world-view to the highly regulated material world of notary offices. Maamoun visited many public notary offices across Cairo to record the appearance of these prayers. The Subduer was performed live in the new version conceived for the Grüner Salon’s space in Berlin.

== Exhibitions and festivals ==
Maha Maamoun’s works have been presented in numerous worldwide institutions including Centre Pompidou, Paris; Tate Modern, London; MoMA, New York; ICP, New York; New Museum, New York; MuHKA, Antwerp; MATHAF – Arab Museum of Modern Art, Doha; Mori Art Museum, Tokyo; Beirut Art Center, Beirut; Makan, Amman; Steirischer Herbst, Graz; Witte de With, Rotterdam; Philadelphia Museum of Art, Philadelphia; Den Frie Centre of Contemporary Art, Copenhagen and Haus der Kunst, Munich.

Her work was also shown in biennials and festivals including the 6th Dak’art Biennale, Dakar; Bamaco 03, Mali; 9th Gwangju Biennale; Sharjah Biennial 10; Transmediale 2014, Berlin and 64th Berlinale, Berlin.

=== Solo shows ===
- 2017 The Law of Existence at Sursock Museum, Beirut.
- 2015 Like Milking a Stone, Rosa Santos, Valencia.
- 2014 The Night of Counting the Years, Fridericianum, Kassel.
- 2014 Lingering in Vicinity, Gypsum Gallery, Cairo.

=== Group exhibitions / Festivals ===
- 2014 Here and Elsewhere, New Museum, New York (US). Section Forum Expanded, 64th Berlin International Film Festival.
- 2014 afterglow, Transmediale, Berlin.
- 2013 – 2014 Meeting Points 7: Ten Thousand Wiles and a Hundred Thousand Tricks, Galerija Nova, Zagreb; MuHKA, Antwerp (BE); Beirut Art Center; CiC, Cairo; Para Site, Hong Kong (CN); Wiener Festwochen, Vienna; V-A-C Foundation, Moscow.
- 2012 – 2014 Tea with Nefertiti, Mathaf: Arab Museum of Modern Art, Doha; L’Institut du monde arabe, Paris; Instituto Valenciano de Arte Moderno, Valencia (ES); Staatliches Museum Ägyptischer Kunst, Munich (DE).
- 2013 Cairo. Open City: New Testimonies from an Ongoing Revolution, Museum Folkwang, Essen (DE).
- 2013 Shifting Gazes, Guest Projects, London.
- 2012 Objects in Mirror are Closer than they Appear, Tate Modern, London.
- 2012 Round Table, 9th Gwangju Biennale (KR).
- 2012 Liquid Archive, Monash University Museum of Art (MUMA), Melbourne (AU).

== Filmography (selected) ==
- Most Fabulous Place (2008)
- Domestic Tourism II (2009)
- 2026 (2010)
- Night Visitor: The Night of Counting the Years (2011)
- Dear Animal (2016)
- Subduer (2017)

== Collections ==
- The Metropolitan Museum of Art, New York
- Deutsche Bank, Frankfurt am Main
- Bonnefantenmuseum, Maastricht
- MuHKA, Antwerp
- Sharjah Art Foundation, Sharjah
- Barjeel Art Foundation, Sharjah
- FRAC – Poitou Charentes, Angoulême
- Whitney Museum of American Art, New York
