= List of museums devoted to one photographer =

Overview of museums devoted to one photographer

This is a list of museums, galleries, or studios devoted or dedicated to a single photographer, or a single pair of photographers. (Many of them host exhibitions of the work of other photographers.)

Subject	Museum	Country	City	ref
William Notman	Notman Photographic Archives	Canada	Montréal, Québec	
Josef Sudek	Josef Sudek Gallery	Czech Republic	Prague	
Mohamed Nagy	Mohamed Nagy Museum	Egypt	Giza, Greater Cairo	
Henri Cartier-Bresson	Henri Cartier-Bresson Foundation	France	Paris	
Robert Doisneau	Maison de la photographie Robert Doisneau	France	Gentilly	
Martine Franck	Henri Cartier-Bresson Foundation	France	Paris	
Nicéphore Niépce	Nicéphore Niépce Museum	France	Chalon-sur-Saône	
August Sander	August Sander Archive	Germany	Cologne	
Robert Capa	Robert Capa Contemporary Photography Center	Hungary	Budapest	
Manó Mai	Mai Manó House	Hungary	Budapest	
Ken Domon	Ken Domon Museum of Photography	Japan	Sakata	
Taikichi Irie	Irie Taikichi Memorial Museum of Photography Nara City	Japan	Nara	
Shōji Ueda	Shoji Ueda Museum of Photography	Japan	Hōki, Tottori	
Manuel Álvarez Bravo	Centro Fotográfico Manuel Álvarez Bravo	Mexico	Oaxaca	
Ara Güler	Ara Güler Museum	Turkey	Istanbul	
Julia Margaret Cameron	Dimbola Museum and Galleries	United Kingdom	Freshwater, Isle of Wight	
Lee Miller	Farleys House	United Kingdom	Chiddingly, East Sussex	
William Henry Fox Talbot	Lacock Abbey	United Kingdom	Lacock, Wiltshire	
Gust Akerlund	Cokato Museum & Gust Akerlund Studio	United States	Cokato, Minnesota	
Alice Austen	Alice Austen House	United States	Staten Island, New York	
H. H. Bennett	H. H. Bennett Studio	United States	Wisconsin Dells, Wisconsin	
O. Winston Link	O. Winston Link Museum	United States	Roanoke, Virginia	
Réhahn	Precious Heritage Art Gallery Museum	Vietnam	Hoi An	

== See also ==
- List of single-artist museums
- List of photographers
