= Museum of Photography =

Museum of Photography may refer to:

- Ara Güler Museum, Istanbul, Turkey
- Museum of Photography, Berlin
- Museum of Photography, Thessaloniki
- Museum of Photography, Seoul
