= Adana Dârüleytâm =

Adana Dârüleytâm-ı Osmani
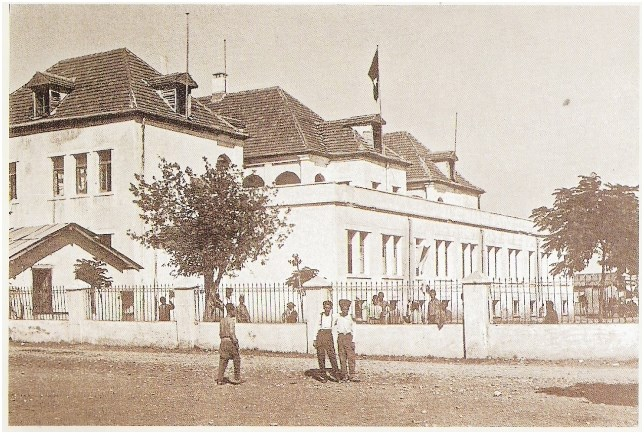
- Interactive map of the Adana Dârüleytâm-ı Osmani area
- Former names: Enver Paşa Dar el Yetem; Taw Mim Simtah; Eytamhane Mektebi
- Alternative names: Adana Ermeni Yetimhanesi

General information
- Type: Orphanage
- Architectural style: North European
- Location: Adana, Turkey, Ziyapaşa Mh., Kıyıboyu Caddesi, Seyhan
- Coordinates: 37°00′38″N 35°19′35″E
- Current tenants: Adana Fen Lisesi
- Construction started: 1909
- Completed: 1911

Technical details
- Floor count: 3

Adana Dârüleytâm-ı Osmani (English: Adana Orphanage) was an orphanage that was built in Adana for the Armenian orphans of the Adana massacre. The building is now part of the Adana Fen Lisesi.

== History ==
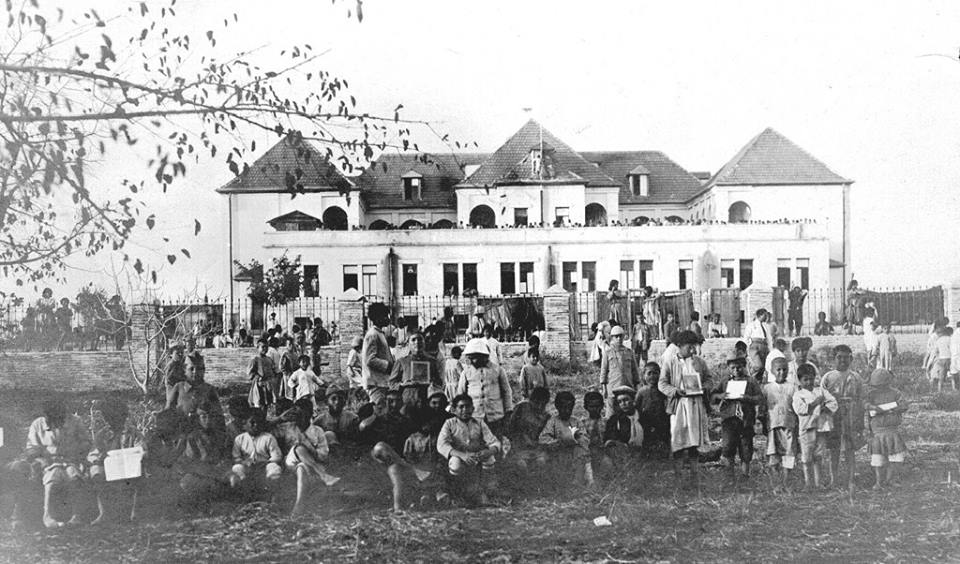
Armenian orphans in 1919

An estimated 3,500 Armenian orphans were left homeless at the aftermath of the Adana Massacre that occurred in April 1909. The Adana Governor Cemal Bey who was appointed on August 8 to investigate the massacre, decided to build an orphanage for the Armenian children. Together with the Armenian Charity Foundation, Vilayet began construction in late 1909.

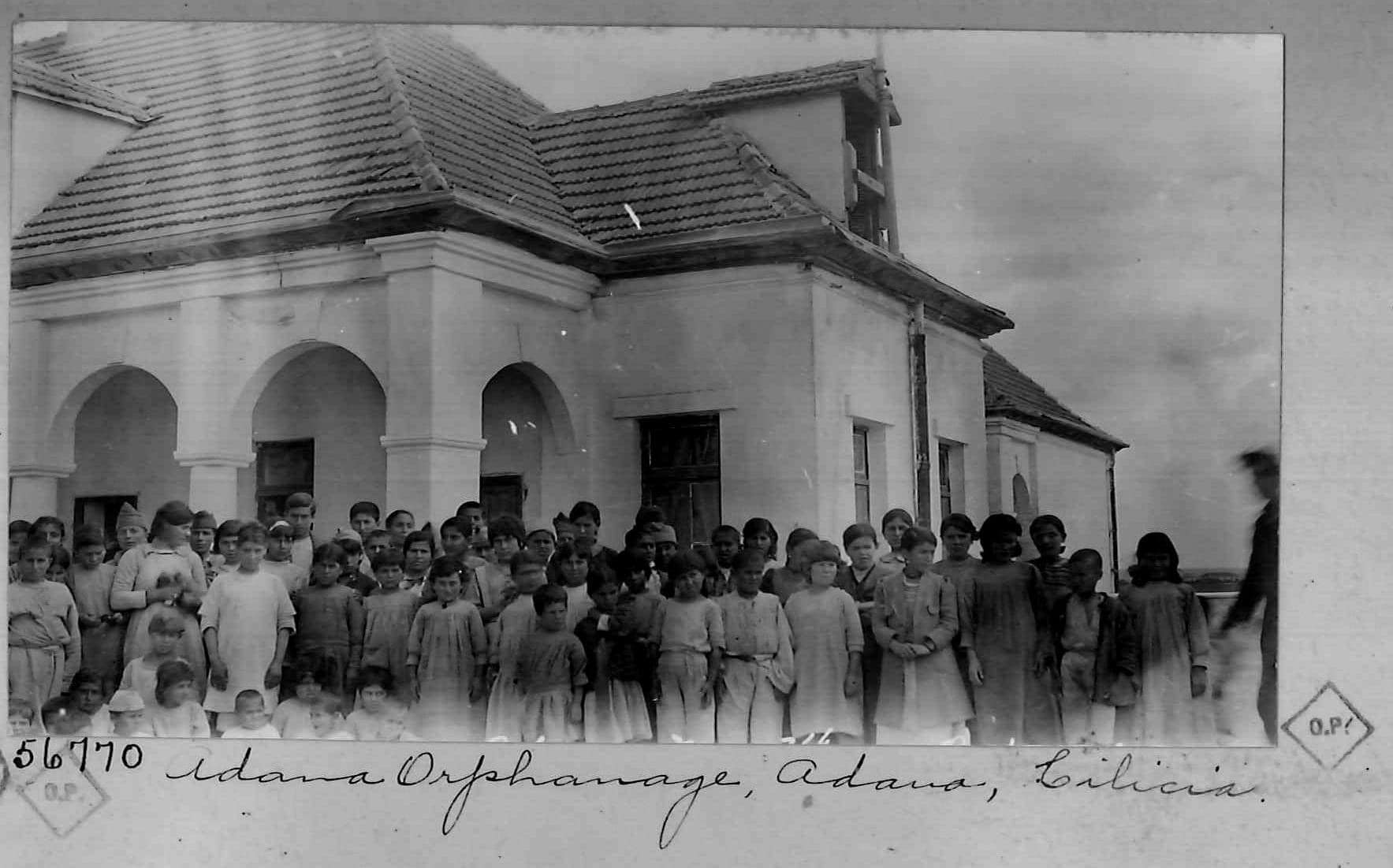
Children in front of the building

The orphanage was opened in 1911 with the accommodation of around 500 Armenian orphans. Despite the prior Armenian orphanages and the Protestant missionary orphanages, the teaching language of the orphanage was solely Turkish. Orphanage administration was sampled from the missionary orphanages. An Armenian, Vahakn Datevyan, was appointed as the principal, though the citizenship and secularism provisions of the 1908 Constitution were put in effect which prevented Christian teachings and the Armenian language. In regards, Armenian Patriarchate filed complaint to the Ministry of Internal Affairs in 1912. The complaint was dismissed, since the aim was the Turkification of orphans and raising them for the military. During the World War I, the orphanage was renamed the Enver Paşa Dar el Yetem. The Principal Datevyan was executed in 1916, in front of the Catholicosate in Sis. After the Armistice of Mudros, the Vorpağnam organisation administered the orphanage, appointing Haçadur Kruzyan as the Principal. In 1920, there were almost 1200 orphans, with the newcomers from Sivas and Kayseri Vilayets.

== Building today ==
Dârüleytâm was closed with the foundation of the Republic of Turkey. Since then the building served as public school. The first school that settled was the Teacher's School for Boys. Then after, the building was used by the Teacher's School for Girls, Çukurova University Faculty of Education and the Adana Anatolian High School. Finally, Adana Fen Lisesi (English: Adana High School for Science) moved into the building in 1987.

== Notable alumni ==
- Ruhi Su (1912-1985), Opera singer

== Gallery ==
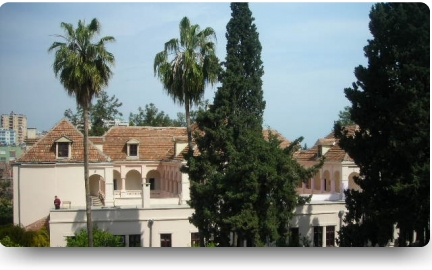
Dârüleytâm building now a part of Adana Fen Lisesi

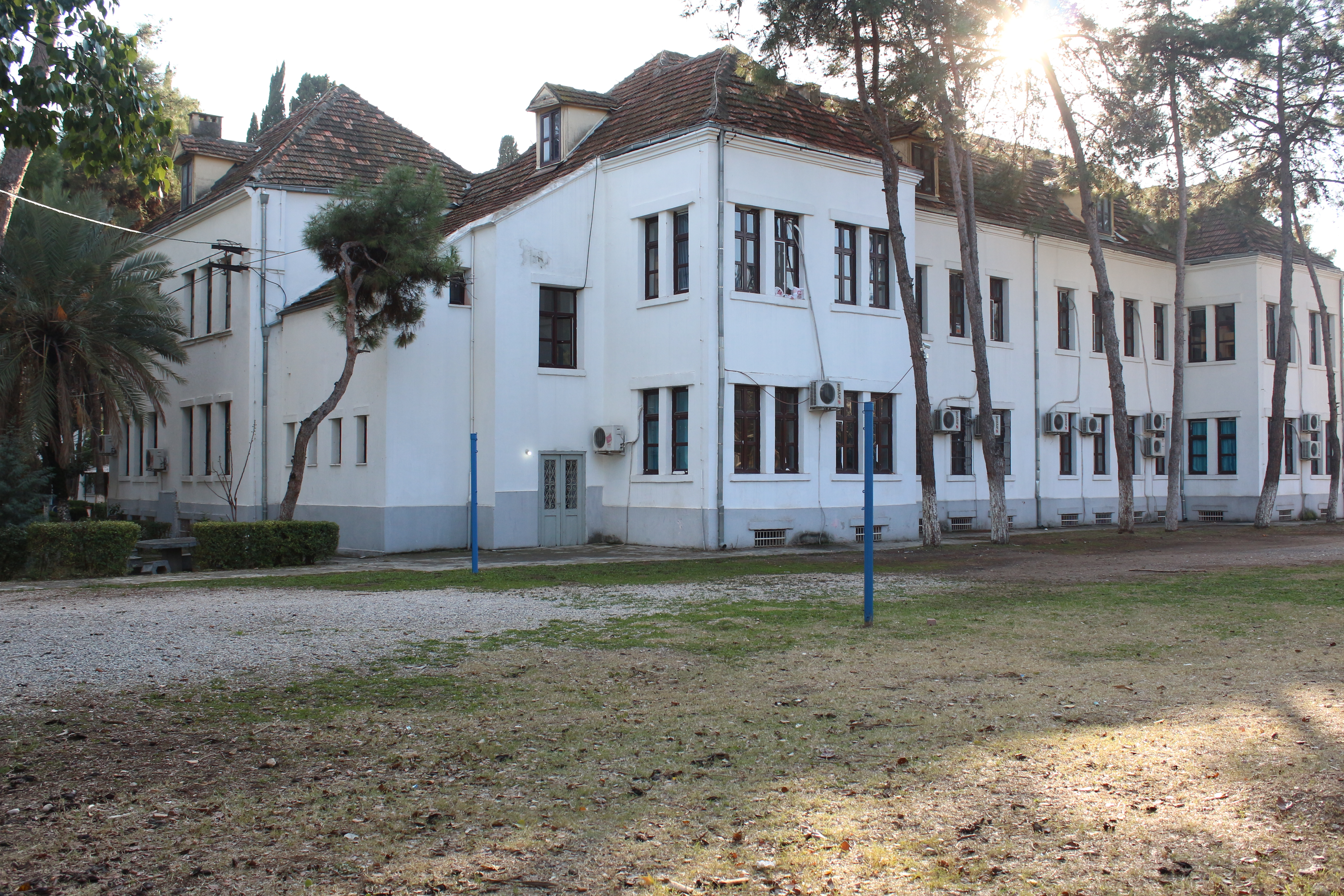
Rear view

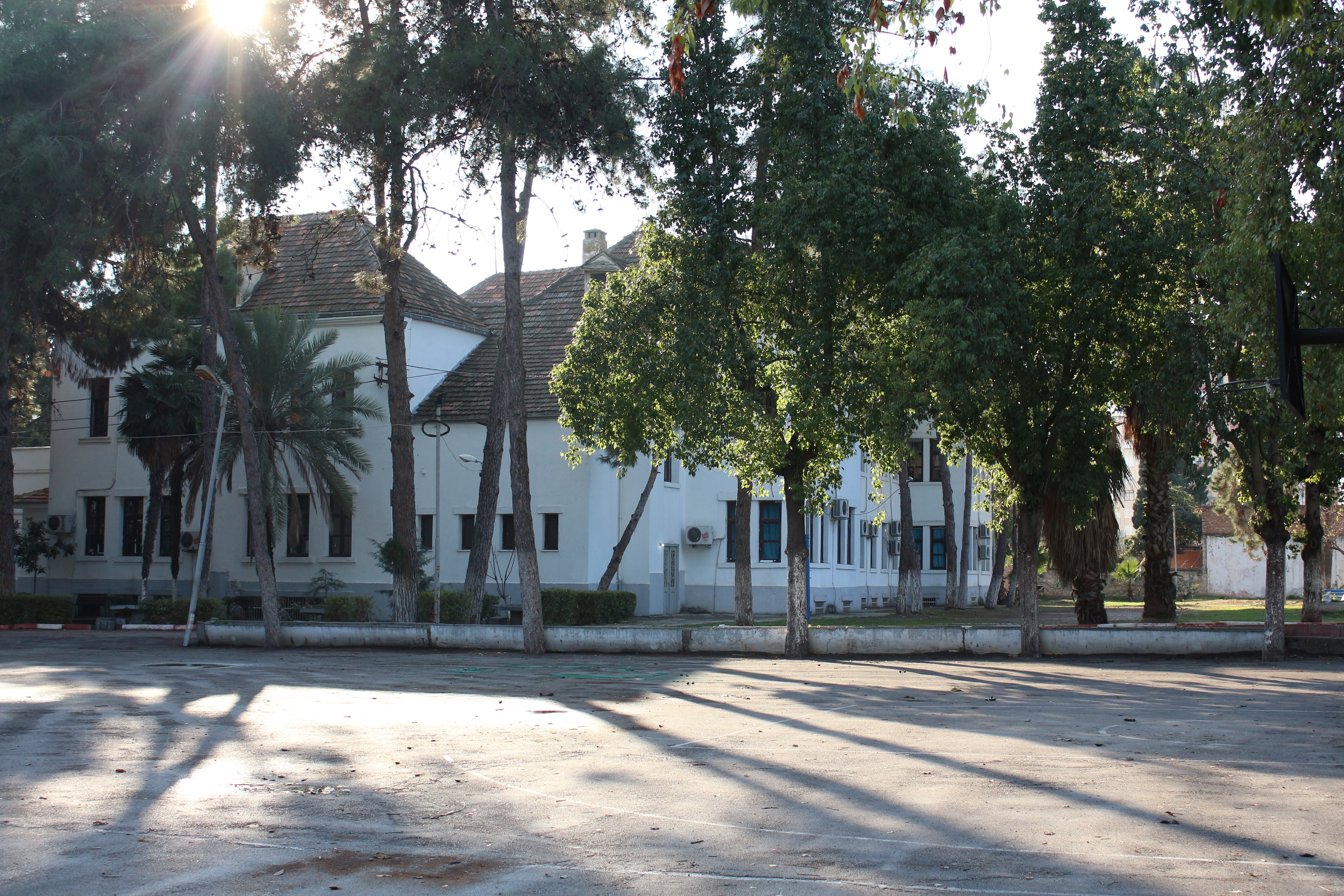
View from the Backyard

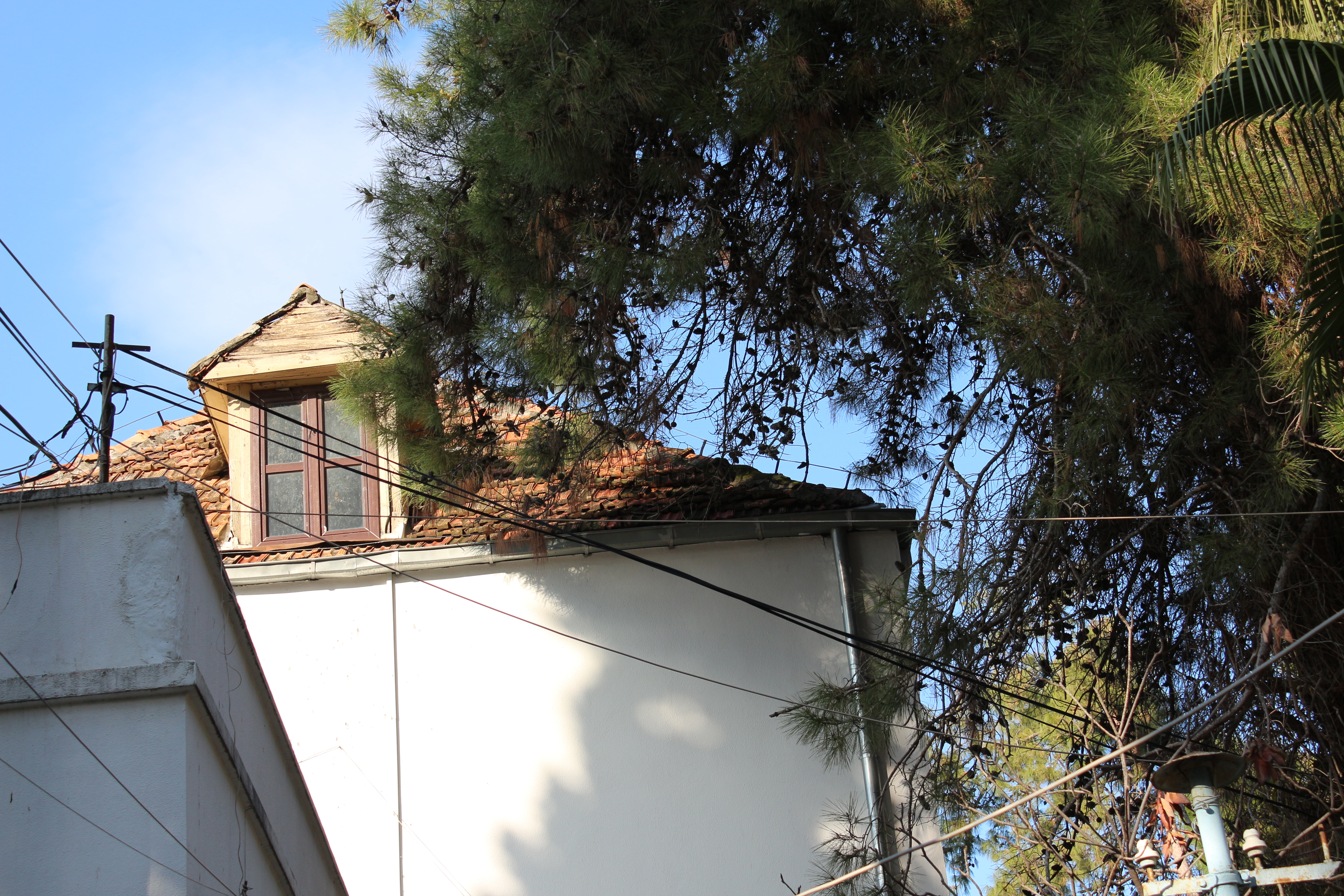
Roof windows

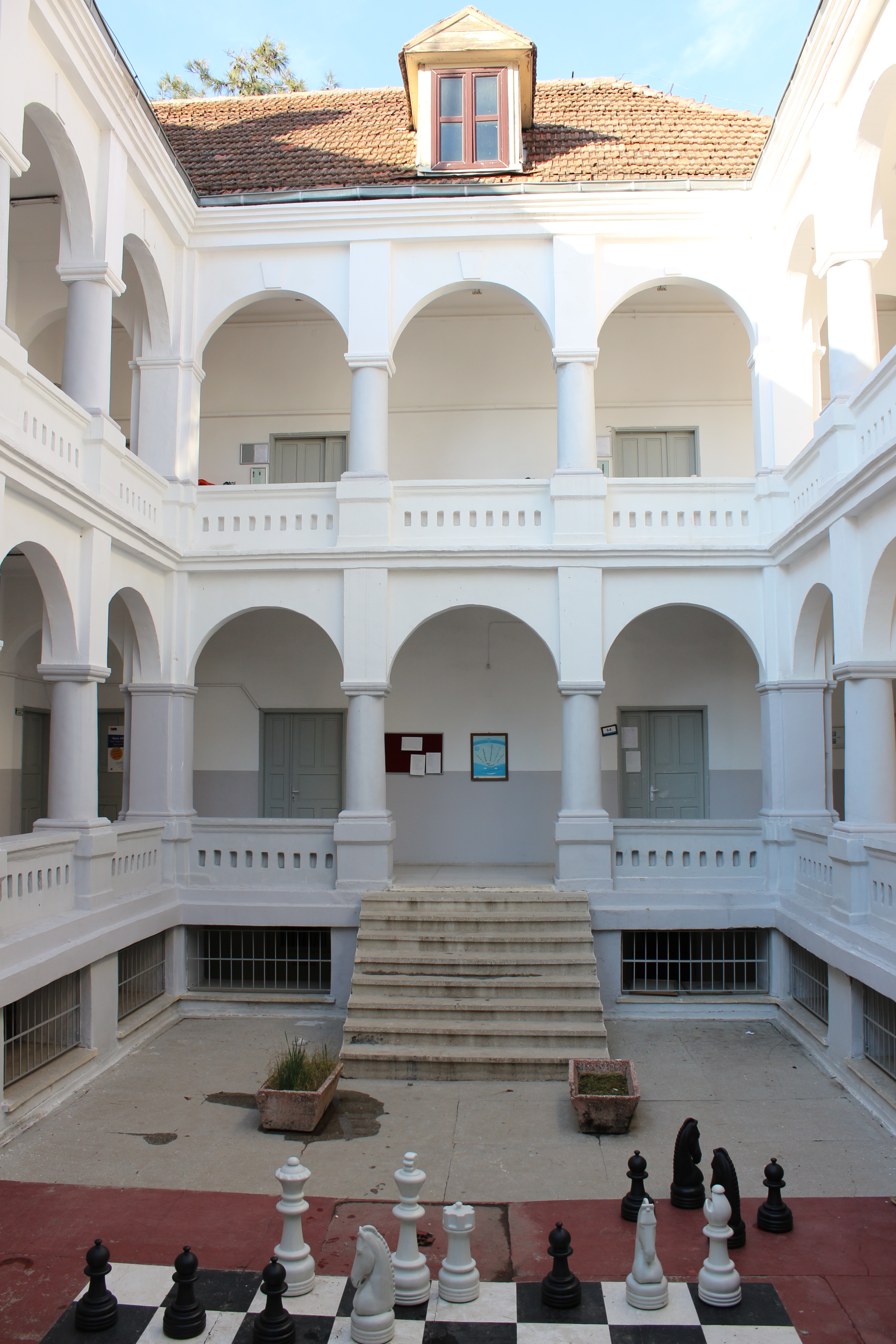
Courtyard
