= Ruhi Su =

Turkish musical artist (1912–1985)

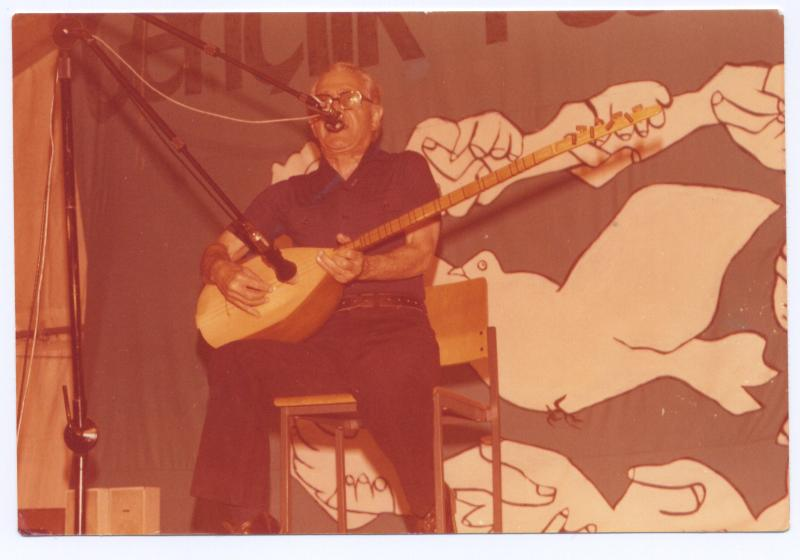
- Ruhi Su at a festival in 1979

Background information
- Born: Mehmet Ruhi Su; 1912; Van, Ottoman Empire
- Died: 1985 (aged 72–73) Istanbul, Turkey
- Genres: Turkish folk music
- Occupation: Singer-songwriter
- Instrument: Bağlama
- Years active: 1942–1985
- Label: İmece Plakları (1971–1985)

Mehmet Ruhi Su (1912 – 20 September 1985) was a Turkish opera singer, Turkish folk singer and saz virtuoso of probable Armenian origin.

== Early life and education ==
Mehmet Ruhi Su was born 1912 in Van. He later expressed his situation: "He is one of the children desolated by the World War I." After he lost his family during World War I at a very early age, he was taken from Van to Adana and given to a childless poor family. After living with the family, he was taken to Dârüleytâm, an orphanage that was built in Adana for the Armenian orphans.

He graduated from the Kuleli Military High School in 1931.

He started playing violin at the age of ten. In 1936 he graduated from the Teacher's School of Music and in 1942 from the Opera Department of State Conservatory in Ankara. The following ten years, he performed at the State Opera in Ankara as a celebrated bass baritone, appearing in operas such as Madame Butterfly, Fidelio, Tosca and Rigoletto. During his contemporary music education, he also studied Turkish folk music and consequently made regular radio programs, playing saz and singing folk songs, while he worked at the opera.

== Political arrest ==
In 1952 he was arrested, accused of being a member of the banned Turkish Communist Party, and imprisonment for five years, which ended his career in the opera. After serving his sentence for a "thought crime", he dedicated himself to folk music in his unique way.

== Career ==
While he roamed all over Anatolia from one village to another, he started compiling numerous folk songs. Ruhi Su combined his efforts of creating a national awareness of the rich Anatolian culture with his compositions based on texts of Sufi poets Yunus Emre and Pir Sultan Abdal and other Anatolian poets like Köroğlu (see Epic of Köroğlu), Karacaoğlan, and Dadaloğlu.

His music was included in the soundtrack of a documentary film made between 1973 and 1975 by Turkish photographer Ara Güler, Hero's End (also translated as The End of the Hero), based on a fictional account of the dismantling of the World War I veteran battlecruiser TCG Yavuz, which played a significant role in the Ottoman Empire's involvement in World War I.

== Death ==
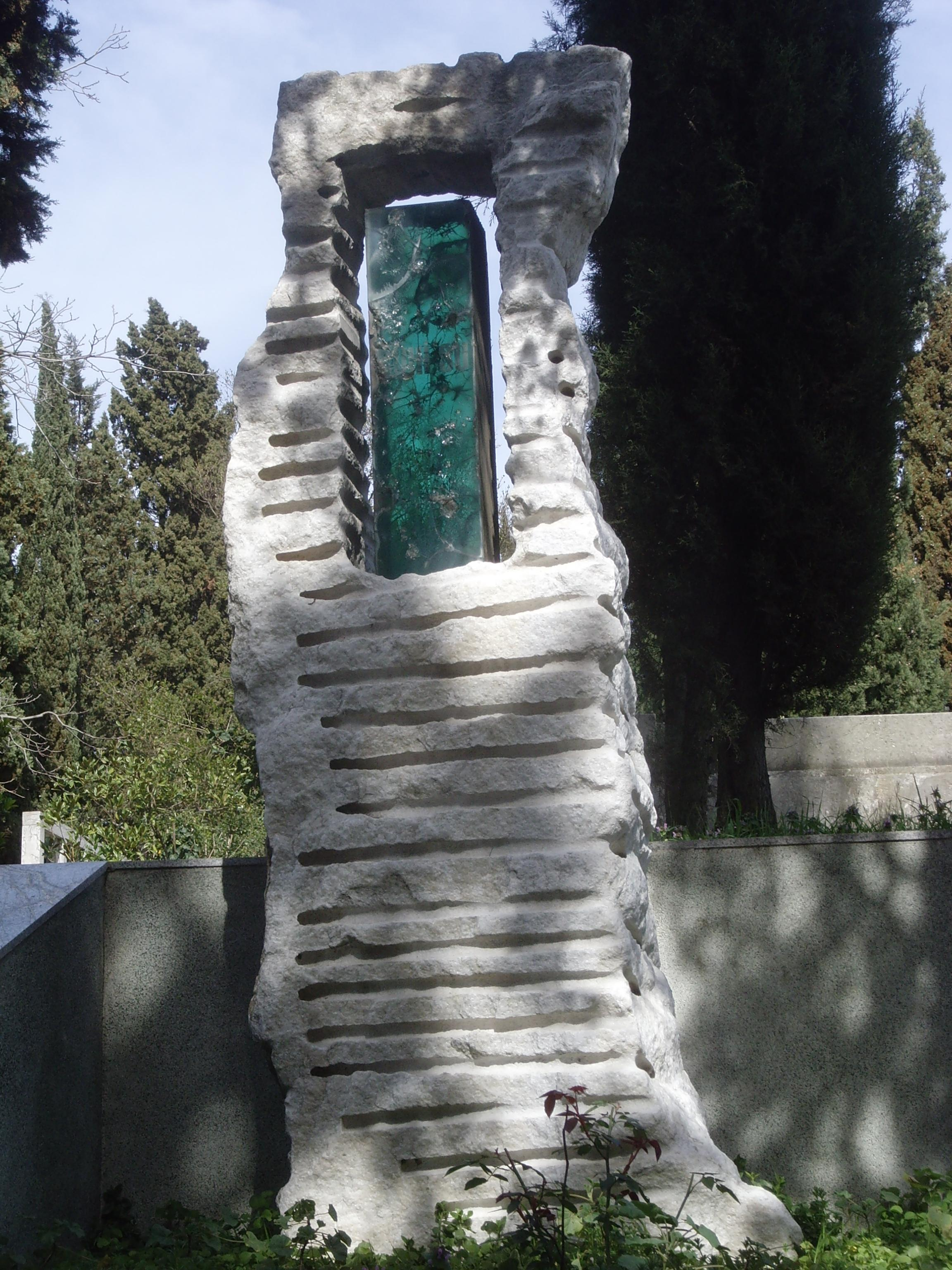
Gravestone of Ruhi Su at Zincirlikuyu Cemetery, Istanbul

Ruhi Su died of prostate cancer on 20 September 1985 and was buried at the Zincirlikuyu Cemetery in Istanbul. In 2009, his gravestone was shot by unknown parties.

== Albums ==
1. (1972) Seferberlik Türküleri Ve Kuvayi Milliye Destanı
2. (1972) Yunus Emre
3. (1972) Karacaoğlan
4. (1972) Pir Sultan Abdal
5. (1974) Şiirler – Türküler
6. (1974) Köroğlu
7. (1977) El Kapıları
8. (1977) Sabahın Sahibi Var

After his death

1. (1986) Pir Sultan'dan Levni'ye
2. (1987) Kadıköy Tiyatrosu Konseri I
3. (1987) Kadıköy Tiyatrosu Konseri II
4. (1988) Beydağı'nın Başı
5. (1988) Dadaloğlu Ve Çevresi
6. (1989) Huma Kuşu Ve Taşlamalar
7. (1990) Sultan Suyu "Pir Sultan Abdal'dan Deyişler"
8. (1990) Ruhi Su performs Sufi Hymns by Yunus Emre and Pir Sultan Abdal
9. (1991) Dostlar Tiyatrosu Konseri (Sümeyra Çakır İle Birlikte)
10. (1992) Ankara'nn Taşına Bak
11. (1993) Semahlar
12. (1993) Çocuklar, Göçler, Balıklar
13. (1993) Zeybekler
14. (1993) Ezgili Yürek
15. (1993) Ekin İdim Oldum Harman
16. (1993) Uyur İken Uyardılar
17. (1994) Barabar
18. (1995) Aman Of
