= Adana Science High School =

Public boarding school in Adana, Turkey

Coordinates: 39°52′38″N 32°48′25″E

- Adana; Turkey

Information
- Established: 1987

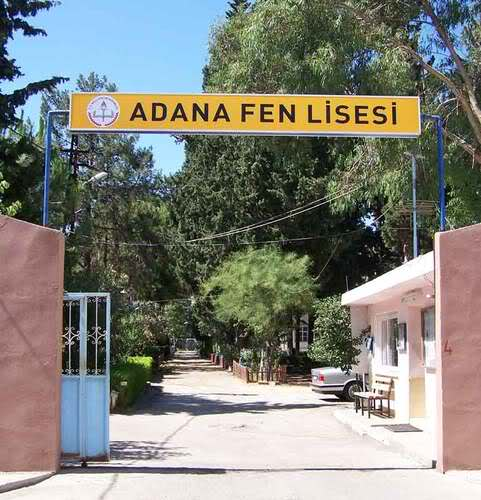
AFL Main Gate

Adana Science High School (Turkish: Adana Fen Lisesi - AFL); is a public boarding high school in Adana, Turkey with a curriculum concentrated on natural sciences and mathematics. It was established in 1987. Due to the considerable success of its alumni in all aspects of professional life and academia, science high school concept is spread around the country and now there are public and private science high schools in all major cities. Its alumni includes many scientists, engineers and doctors as well as famed musicians .

The historical building of the school (Taş Bina) was built as an orphanage for Adana massacre’s survivors (Darüleytam) in 1909.

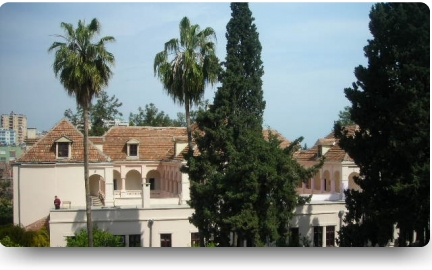
AFL Main Building

== See also ==
- Science High School (disambiguation)
