= Nicéphore Niépce Museum =

French photography museum

Coordinates: 46°46′49″N 4°51′21″E

The Nicéphore Niépce Museum is a museum dedicated to the history of photography founded in 1972, officially designated a Musée de France, and dedicated to the inventor of photography Nicéphore Niépce (1765–1833). The Nicéphore Niépce Museum is located in Chalon-sur-Saône in Saône-et-Loire, France.

== Collection and exhibitions ==
Located in the former Royal Messengers' lodgings, the Nicéphore Niépce Museum holds a collection of rare photographs and over 6,000 cameras and related items. Additionally, the museum presents exhibits that range from early cameras belonging to Nicéphore Niépce and his associate Daguerre, the first color photographs, photochromes from 1868 to holographic images; as well as, early Kodak and Globuloscope panoramic cameras. The exhibits at the museum inform the visitors of the invention of photography while also showcasing the immense progress made in the field of photography in last 200 years.

== See also ==
- List of museums devoted to one photographer
