= Shoji Ueda Museum of Photography =

Museum dedicated to the work of Shoji Ueda

Coordinates: 35.3899°N 133.4358°E

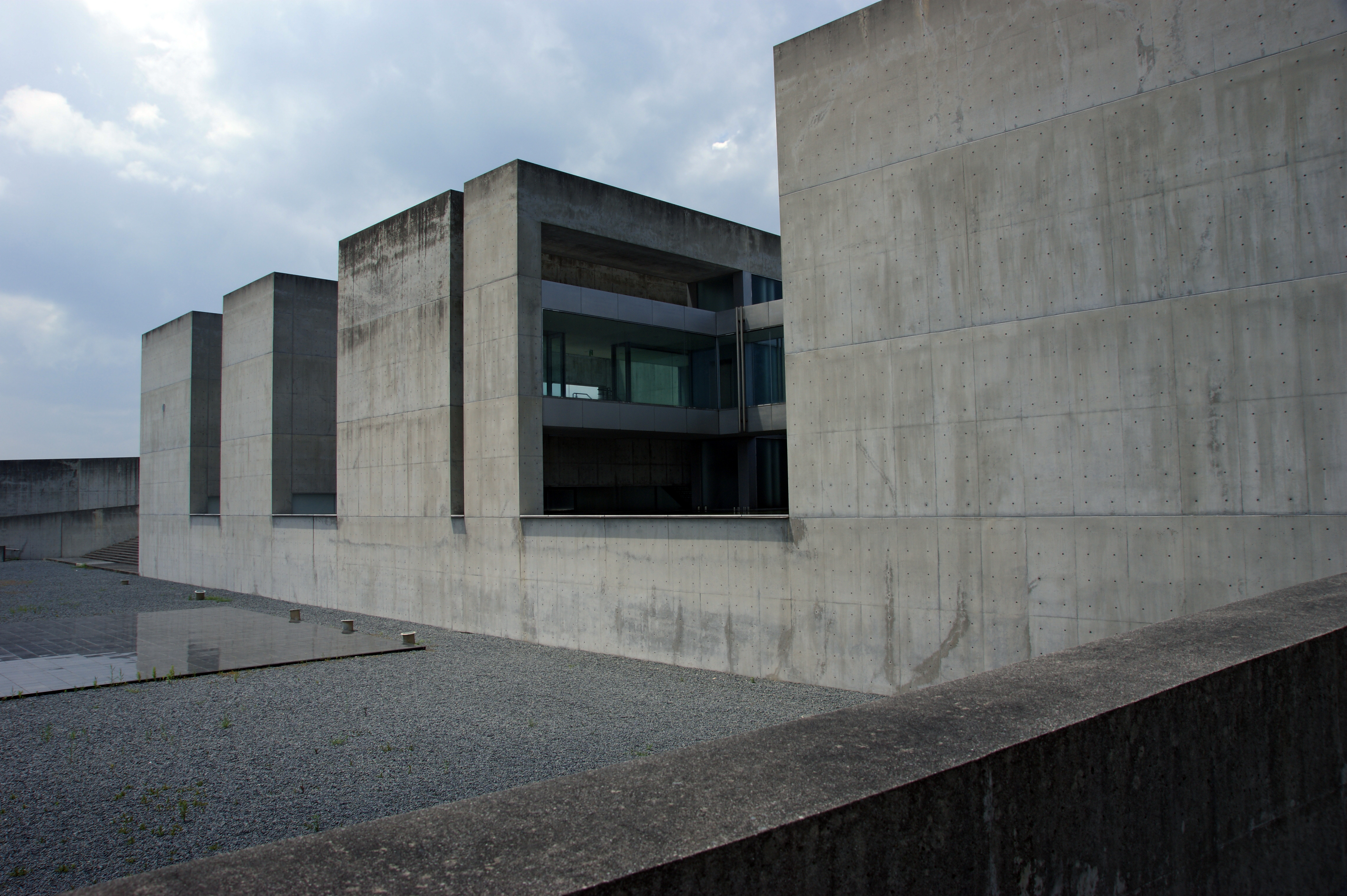
Shoji Ueda Museum of Photography

The Shoji Ueda Museum of Photography, is a museum in Hōki, Tottori, Japan that is solely dedicated to exhibiting and archiving the work of the photographer Shoji Ueda.

The museum was founded in 1995. The collection consists of over 12,000 works by Shoji Ueda. The building was designed by Shin Takamatsu. The architectural relationships between volumetric solids and voids (as scaled incisions in the volume) function to frame Mount Daisen.

== Gallery ==
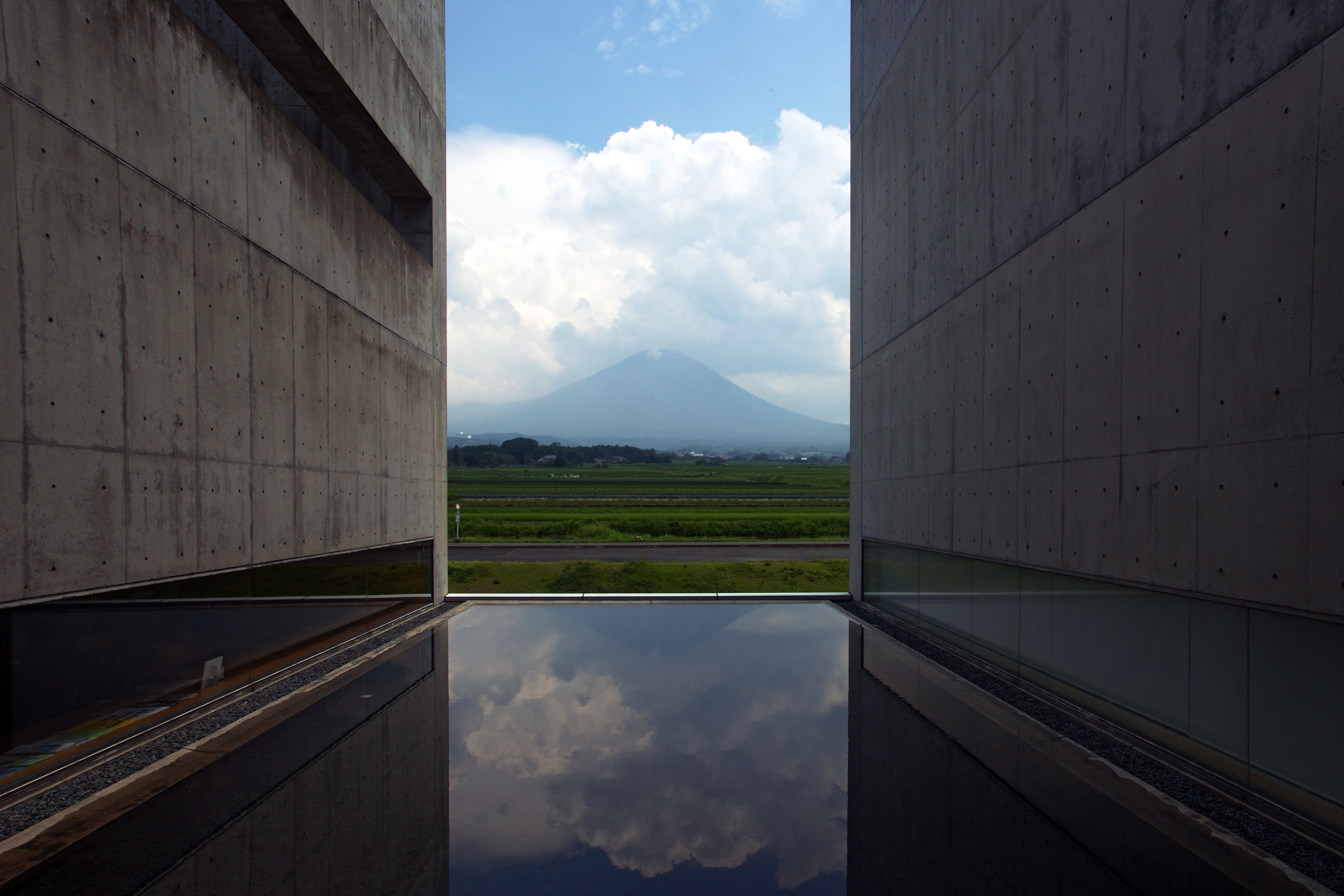

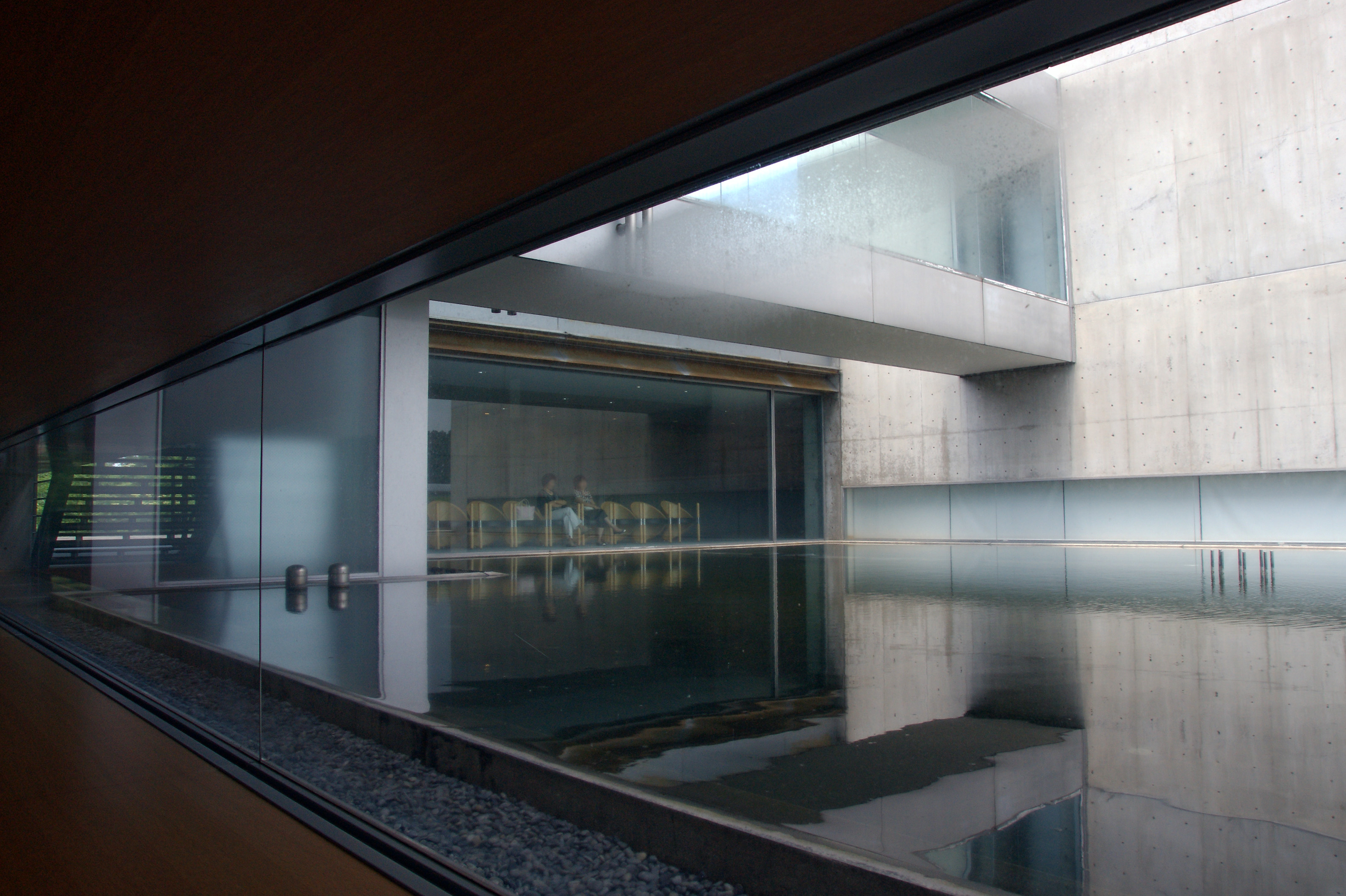

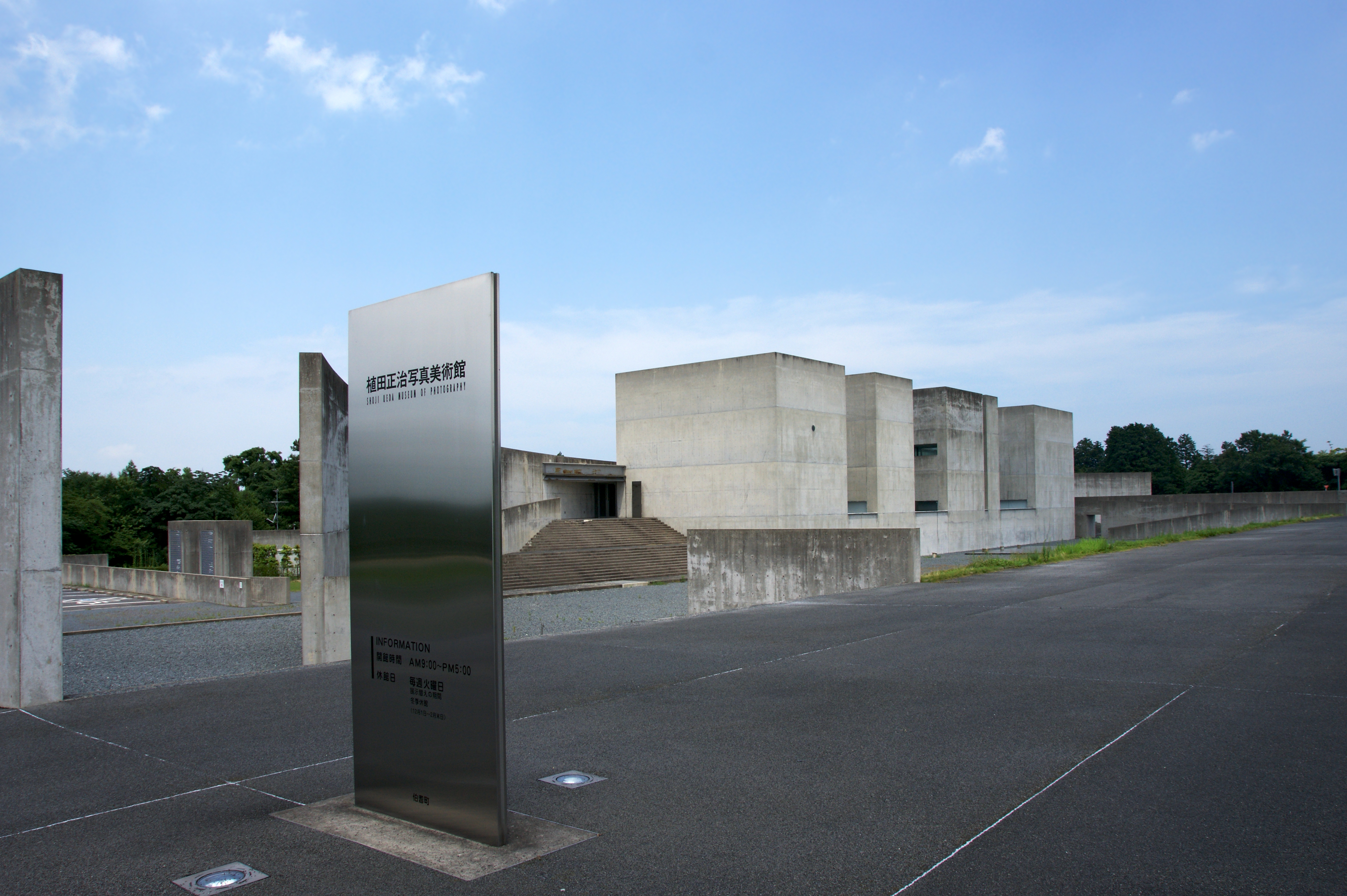

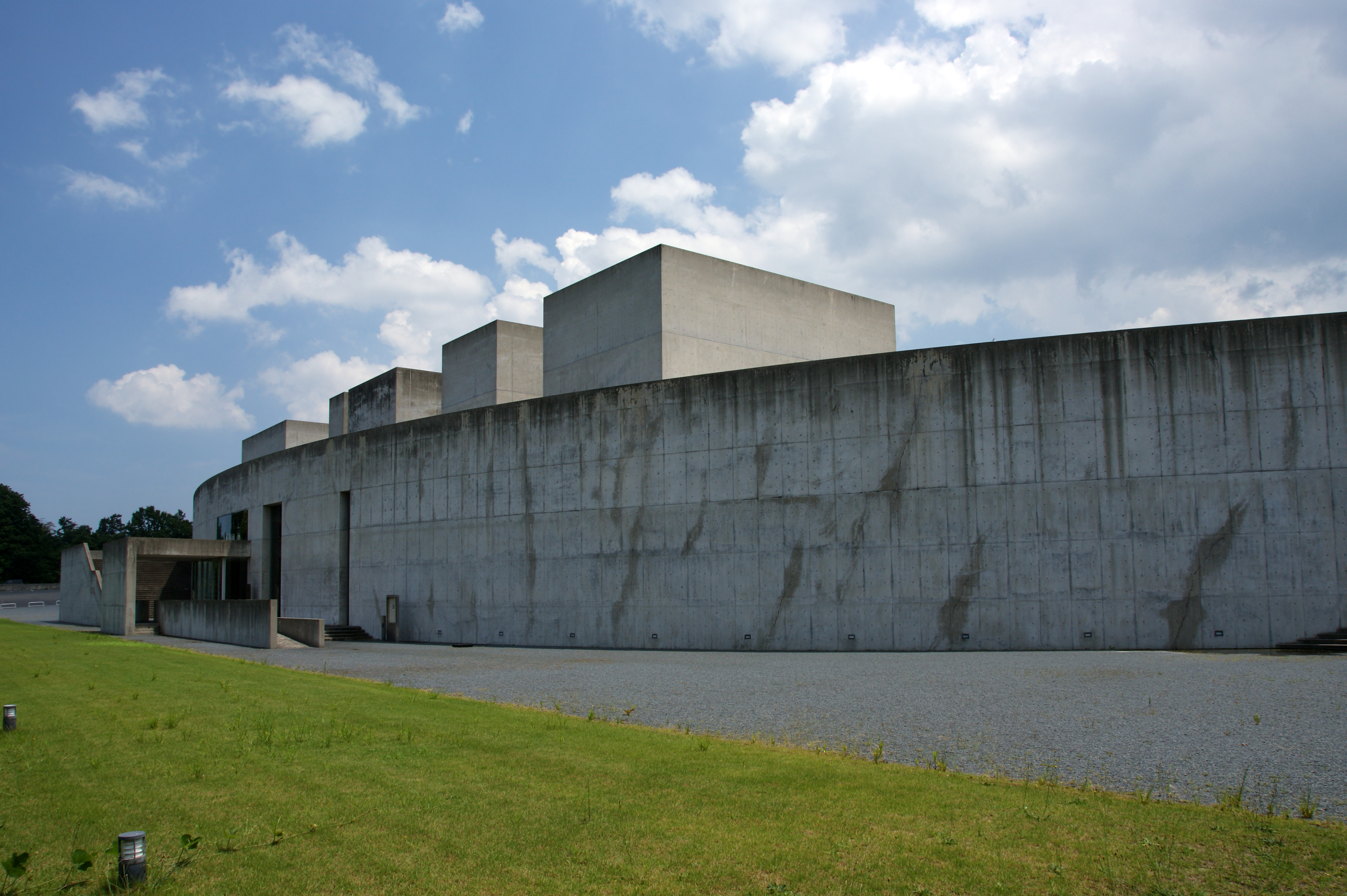

== See also ==
- List of museums devoted to one photographer
