= Effat Nagy =

Egyptian artist (1905–1994)

Effat Mousa Nagy
- Born: 5 April 1905; Alexandria
- Died: 4 October 1994 (aged 89)
- Education: high school
- Spouse: Saad El-Khadem
- Relatives: Mohamed Nagy

Effat Nagy (Arabic: عفت ناجي. Nagi, Effat Naghi, or Effat Nagui) (5 April 1905 – 4 October 1994) was an Egyptian artist who has a museum in Cairo devoted to her and her husband's works. The museum is called Museum of Saad El-Khadem and Effat Nagy.

== Life ==
Effat Mousa Nagy was born in the Mediterranean port of Alexandria in 1905. She was fascinated by culture and she was trained in music and mathematics. She was taught art by a private tutor and her artistic brother Mohamed Nagy. Her formal training was at the Arts Academy in Rome in 1947. She worked in Egypt under André Lhote and they used Egyptian archaeology as subject matter.

She married Saad Al-Khadem in 1945. He was also an artist but also a researcher. Her husband's research inspired her art.

In 1956 she received a compliment from her brother. He said that her work exceeded his as he felt that his work was too restrained by his academic training.

In 1964 she exhibited her work at the High Dam (as-Sad al-'Aali) Exhibition. This was a result of work that she had been commissioned to do the previous year. She was asked to record the archaeology that would be lost as it was submerged under the waters of the Aswan Dam as it was constructed. She was one of 64 artists chosen to do this work.

In 1968 the Mohamed Nagy Museum was founded and Nagy made a donation of forty of her brother's paintings to help create a collection of her brother's work.

Nagy died in 1994 although another source says 1997.

== Selected solo exhibitions ==
- At Alexandria Atelier 1948
- At association of Fine arts lovers, Cairo 1956
- At the Museum of Fine arts, Alexandria 1957
- in Florenca and Rome 1962
- At Golden circle gallery, Switzerlands 1971
- At the French Cultural Center, Alexandria, accompanied by Symposium about Andriea Lout 1976
- At Mashrabia gallery, Cairo 1987
- At A-Qandeel gallery entitle` 50 years of Effat Nagy` 1992
- At Atelier 1999

== Legacy ==
Nagy and her husband have a museum in Cairo which contains about 200 of their paintings and pottery. The Museum of Saad El-Khadem and Effat Nagy holds 24 paintings by Nagy and 34 by her husband including a large nude where Nagy is the model. The building also contains their old library which holds many useful books on folklore and astrology. Nagy left her house to the Egyptian government, but it was the French government who paid for her biography to be published.
