= Mohamed Nagy Museum =

- Established: 1968; 58 years ago
- Location: 9 Mahmoud El Gendi Street, Haram district, Giza, Egypt
- Type: Photography
- Collection size: Paintings and sketches of Mohamed Nagy
- Visitors: Public

Mohamed Nagy Museum is a photography and biographical art history museum in Giza, Egypt. It is located at 9 Mahmoud El Gendi Street, close to the Giza Plateau, in the southwest of the Greater Cairo metropolis, Egypt. It was initially Mohamed Nagy's studio which he founded in 1952. Nagy was a pioneer of modern Egyptian photographic art and is considered in modern Egypt to be one the country's most renowned painters.

After Mohamed Nagy's death it was formally inaugurated as a museum on 13 July 1968 by Tharwat Okasha, the Egyptian Minister of Culture. In 1991 the museum was refurbished.

== History ==
Nagy had pioneered Egyptian photographic modern art on his return from Florence where he had been training, and in 1952, while director of the Museum of Modern Art (now the Gezira Center for Modern Art), he developed a plot of land that he owned and built his studio. Following his death in his studio in 1956, in 1962 his life and work were commemorated by the Ministry of Culture which purchased his studio and converted it into a museum named in his honour. The museum has 1,200 exhibits; initially his sister, Effat Nagy, who was also a painter and has another museum devoted to her work, donated about 40 of Nagy's oil paintings to the new museum, as well as a large collection of his sketches and personal effects. More works were added to the collection following the purchase in 1987 of many of Nagy's oil paintings by the Ministry of Culture and further donations by his sister. Following a major refurbishment the museum was reopened in 1991. Nagy's painting "Egyptian Revival," which had been displayed in the Paris Salon and honored with a gold medal, is housed in the museum.

The museum has published a catalogue titled The Family of the Artist in the Country.

== See also ==
- List of museums devoted to one photographer
