= Réhahn =

French photographer (born 1979)

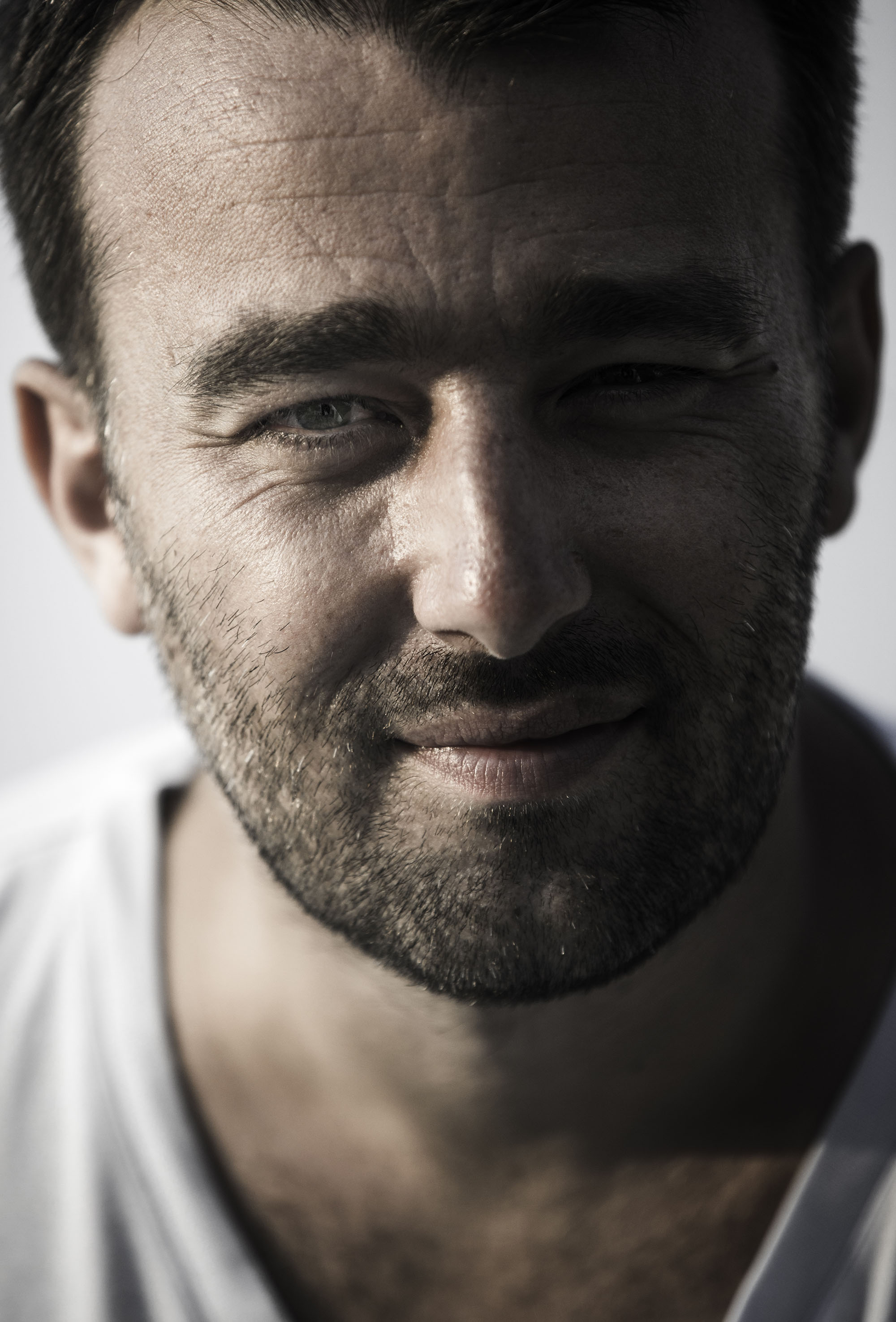
- Réhahn in 2014
- Born: 1979; Bayeux, France
- Occupations: Artist, author, collector
- Organization: Precious Heritage Art Gallery Museum
- Known for: Cultural preservation work
- Notable work: Hidden Smile, Best Friends
- Website: rehahnphotographer.com

Réhahn Croquevielle, commonly known as Réhahn (born 1979 in Bayeux, Normandy, France), is a French photographer and art collector based in Hoi An, Vietnam. His work often focuses on themes such as memory, cultural heritage, and the documentation of traditional practices in countries including Vietnam, Cuba, Malaysia, and India.

In 2010, he began the Precious Heritage Project, aimed at documenting Vietnam’s ethnic communities through photography and the collection of traditional clothing and cultural items. The project explores the effects of modernization on these communities and their customs.

On 1 January 2017, Réhahn opened the Precious Heritage Art Gallery Museum in Hoi An, which displays portraits, recorded stories, and traditional garments from ethnic groups officially recognized by the Vietnamese government.

As of 2020, he had documented all 54 officially recognized ethnic groups and has continued to research additional subgroups.

== Career ==
Réhahn first visited Vietnam in 2007 during a humanitarian trip with the organization Les Enfants du Viêtnam. He moved to Hội An in 2011, and published a photo book, Mosaic of Contrasts, in 2014.

Réhahn appeared on the French television program Échappées belles (France 5) in a 2016 episode focused on Vietnam.

He later published two sequel books: Vietnam, Mosaic of Contrasts Volume II (2015) and Volume III (2020), as well as thematic collections such as The Collection: 10 Years of Photography (2018) and 100 Iconic Portraits (2019), which include images from Vietnam, Cuba, Malaysia, and parts of Central and South America and the Indian subcontinent.

=== Impressionist photography ===
In 2022, Réhahn began working in the style of impressionist photography, blurring the lines between photography and painting. Inspired by Impressionism and Post-Impressionism, which focus on light, fleeting moments, and emotional essence. In 2023, a temporary open-air exhibition was organized by the City of Honfleur to mark the 50th anniversary of diplomatic relations between France and Vietnam. The event featured approximately forty photographs by Réhahn displayed along the "Jardin des Personnalités," a location symbolically linked to the history of impressionism. The Vietnamese Ambassador to France, H.E. Dinh Toan Thang, and the Mayor of Honfleur, Michel Lamarre, attended the inauguration. He has stated that his approach, incorporates compositional techniques associated with Japonisme. In an article published by Lenscratch, the artist mentions his interest in painting and cites Claude Monet, Edgar Degas, Paul Cézanne, and Vincent van Gogh among his influences.

== Notable works ==
- Best Friends: Taken in 2014, this photograph depicts Kim Luan/H’Cúc Teh, a six-year-old Mnong girl, standing in front of an elephant. As of 2017, it's the most expensive photo sold in Vietnam.
- Hidden Smile: This portrait of Xong, a 73-year-old boat rower, was selected in 2015 for the permanent collection of the Vietnamese Women's Museum in Hanoi. It was the cover photo of Réhahn's 2014 book Vietnam, Mosaic of Contrasts, and has been widely published.
- An Phuoc: Widely published in both domestic and international outlets, this portrait received attention from National Geographic, BBC, Business Insider, and the Independent UK. It also appeared on covers of magazines such as Globe-Trotters and the French edition of Geo.

== Reception ==
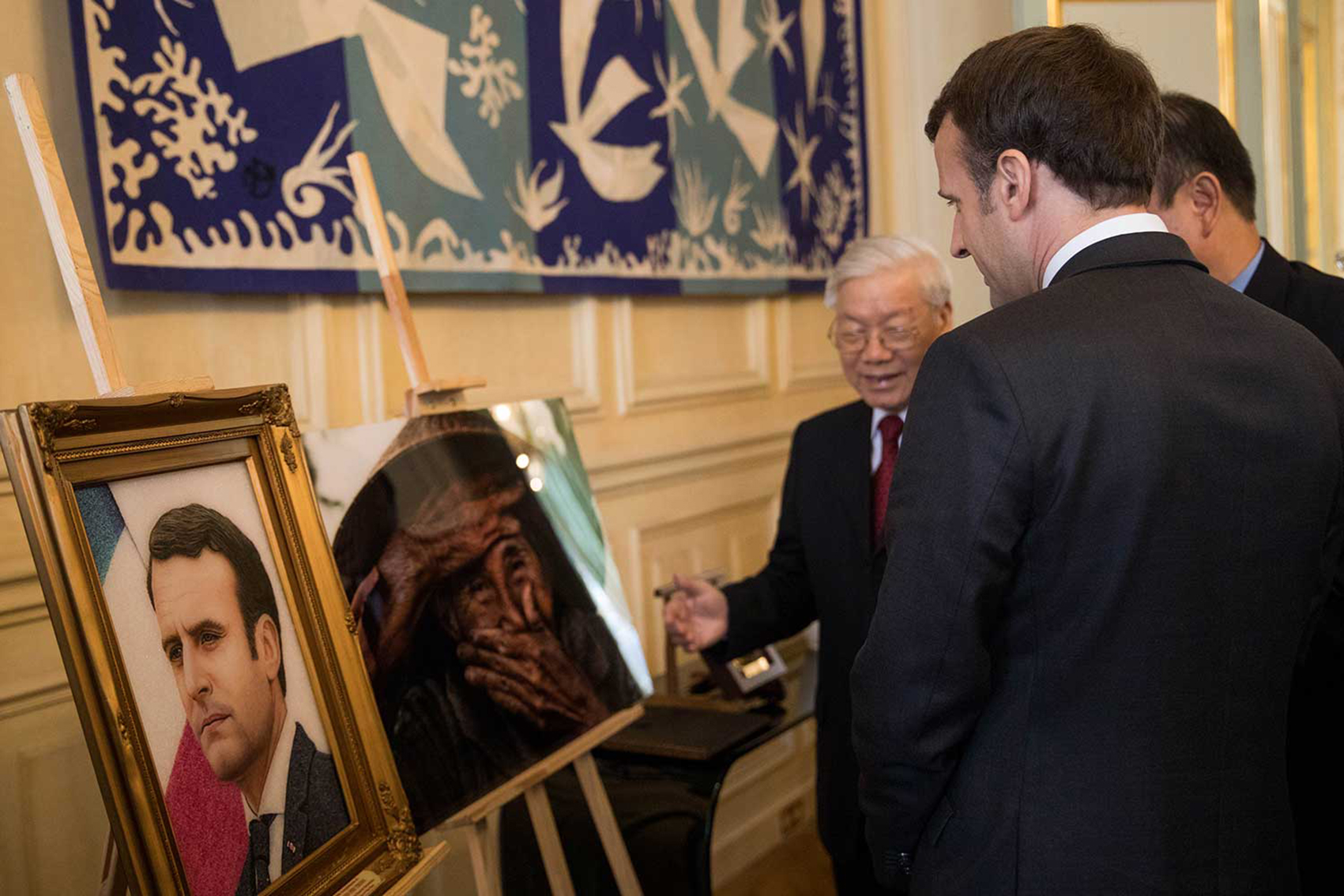
President Emmanuel Macron receiving Hidden Smile by Réhahn – March 2018

In December 2014, Réhahn was ranked fourth among the top 10 travel photographers worldwide by the website Bored Panda. In January 2016, the French website Lense.fr listed him as the second most popular French photographer online, placed 56th overall. As of 2017, he had half a million followers on Facebook.

Matca, a Vietnamese photography journal, published a piece on Réhahn's work in 2017 by writer and photographer Hà Đào. Finding Réhahn's popularity unsettling and his approach trite, she criticized ways in which he, in her view, depicted the Vietnamese people by exoticizing them and Vietnam. Đào said that his portraits are vibrant and carefully composed, but that he projected a colonialist fantasy. She compared his work to that of photographers like Edward S. Curtis, Steve McCurry and Jimmy Nelson. Following the 2017 article, Matca published a response from Réhahn.

In March 2018, during a ceremony marking the 45th anniversary of diplomatic relations between France and Vietnam, Vietnamese Party Secretary Nguyen Phu Trong, who later became President of Vietnam, offered French President Emmanuel Macron a copy of Réhahn’s portrait Hidden Smile. Macron mentioned the gift during a speech and commented on the symbolic power of the image and its emotional resonance. The same month, Réhahn received the Trophée des Français de l'Étranger 2018 from the French website Le Petit Journal, in recognition of his work in Vietnam.

In May 2025, the Royal Photographic Society published in RPS Journal, an article titled What would Van Gogh have made of Vietnam? The article extrapolates on how Van Gogh's letters influenced Réhahn, inspiring experimentation with photographic techniques to evoke impressionism without digital retouching. It highlights his use of water reflections and smoke from burnt crops to produce visual effects resembling impressionist brush strokes.

== The Precious Heritage Project ==
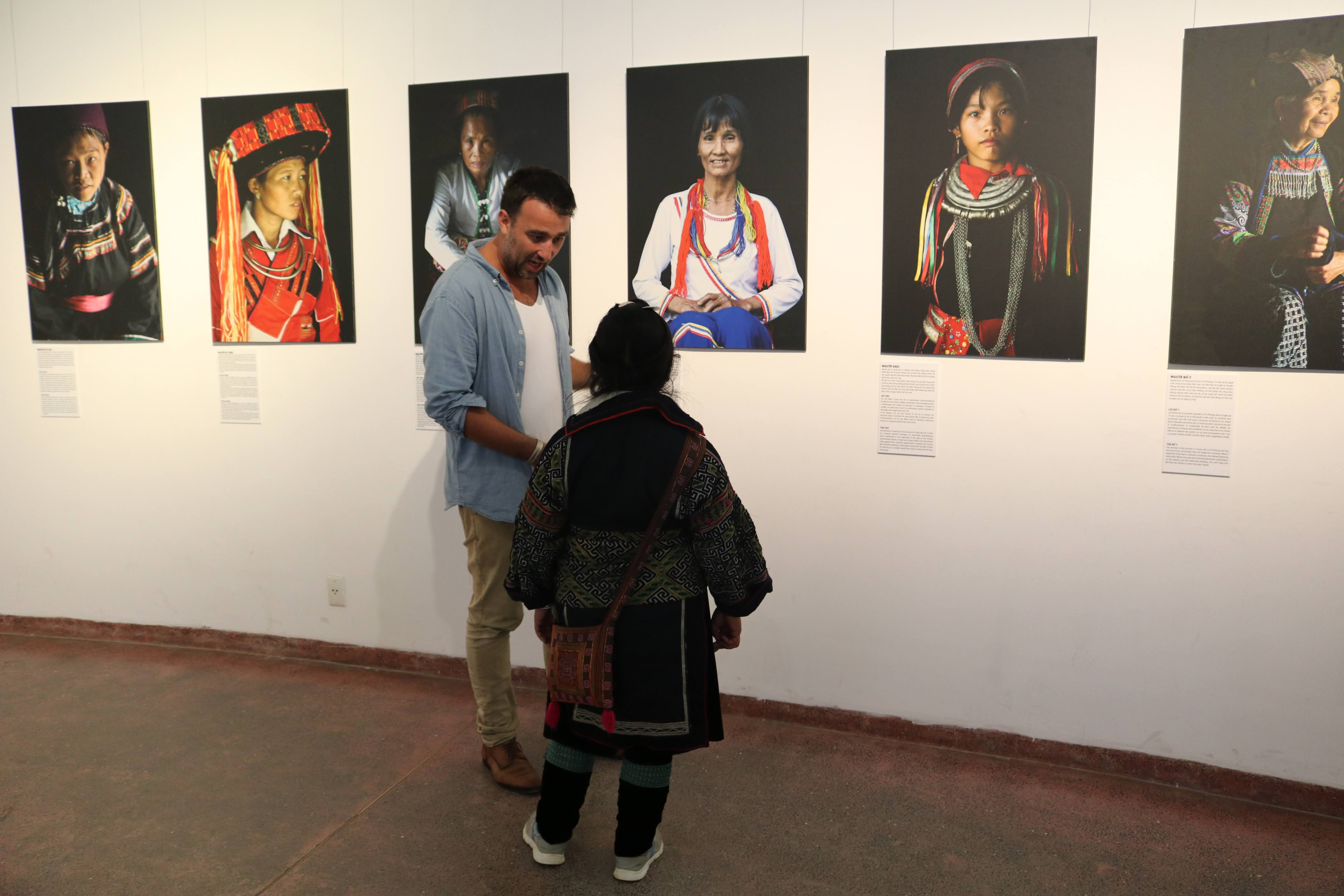
Rehahn in 2017

In 2010, during a journey to meet ethnic groups in northern Vietnam, Réhahn discovered the diversity and cultural richness of these communities, but also the fragility of their heritage. Traditional costumes, dialects, rituals, and ancestral know-how were disappearing or being replaced as the country continued to modernize. Réhahn began collecting traditional costumes offered by village chiefs in order to showcase and preserve their culture.

On January 1, 2017, he opened the Precious Heritage Art Gallery Museum to promote understanding and recognition of the diverse ethnic groups present in Vietnam Spread over 500 m², this cultural art space exhibits more than 200 photographs of members of each ethnic group in their traditional attire. In addition to the photographs, more than 65 authentic traditional costumes are on display. Each ethnic group is presented alongside the story of Réhahn’s encounter with them, shared in English, French, and Vietnamese.

In 2020, Réhahn completed his primary mission: to research, meet, and document all 54 officially recognized ethnic groups in Vietnam.

=== Precious Heritage Art Gallery and Cultural Museum ===
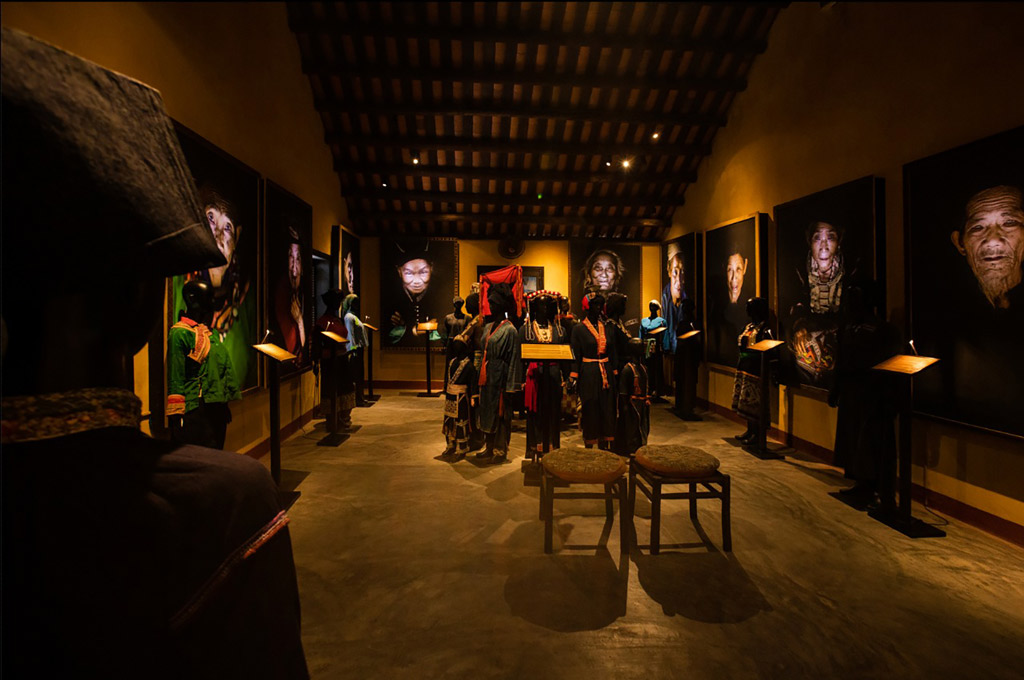
Permanent exhibition of Réhahn's Precious Heritage work

The Precious Heritage Art Gallery and Cultural Museum is a museum in Hoi An, Vietnam founded by Réhahn. The museum opened on 1 January 2017, and presents photographic portraits, traditional costumes and stories about the diverse cultures of Vietnam's ethnic groups. It is the culmination of the Precious Heritage Project. The museum's mission is to promote the preservation and importance of Vietnam's ethnic groups through cultural understanding and respect. The museum is located in a 19th-century French house, which has been classified as historic architecture by the city of Hoi An.

The New York Times' travel writer suggested the museum as part of a "36 Hours in Hoi An" tour. Lonely Planet called it an "an essential detour".

==== History ====
During his 2010 travels in North Vietnam, the photographer met several tribes around Sapa, he learned that there are more than 54 different ethnic groups throughout the country. Each group has a separate language with different linguistic roots; as well as diverse heritage costumes and handicrafts; architectural traditions; and religious beliefs. Dialects and traditions were changing as younger generations moved away from their villages, and in turn, elements of their cultural heritage were slowly declining.

Réhahn began to take photographic portraits of people each group wearing their traditional costumes. He decided to create a space dedicated to Vietnam's ethnic groups in order to document some of this cultural heritage and to show his own work The museum opened in 2017. It is financed by Réhahn and is free to the public. By January 2020, Réhahn he had documented all 54 ethnic groups and sub-groups.

==== Permanent collection ====
The museum holds a comprehensive collection of ethnic costumes, artifacts, and stories. It includes more than 200 photographs of Vietnam, including the formal portrait series of each of the 54 ethnic groups in their traditional tribal garments. Over 50 original costumes are on display, some of which are among the last of their kind, and some were donated by chiefs of the associated ethnic groups.

The museum also includes a room dedicated to information about the indigo dyeing process used by many tribal groups such as the Dao and Hmong.

== Publications ==
Réhahn has published several bilingual photography books, often focused on Vietnam and the concept of impermanence.

- Réhahn (January 2014). Vietnam, Mosaic of Contrasts Volume I (in French and English) ISBN 978-604-936-436-5
- Réhahn (November 2015). Vietnam, Mosaic of Contrasts Volume II (in French and English) ISBN 978-604-86-9307-7
- Réhahn (December 2018). The Collection, 10 Years of Photography (in French and English)
- Réhahn (November 2019). 100 Iconic Portraits (in French and English) ISBN 978-604-951-621-4
- Réhahn (February 2020). Vietnam, Mosaic of Contrasts Volume III (in French and English) ISBN 978-604-86-4292-1
- Réhahn (October 2024). Impressionism, From Photography to Painting (in French and English)

== Private collection ==
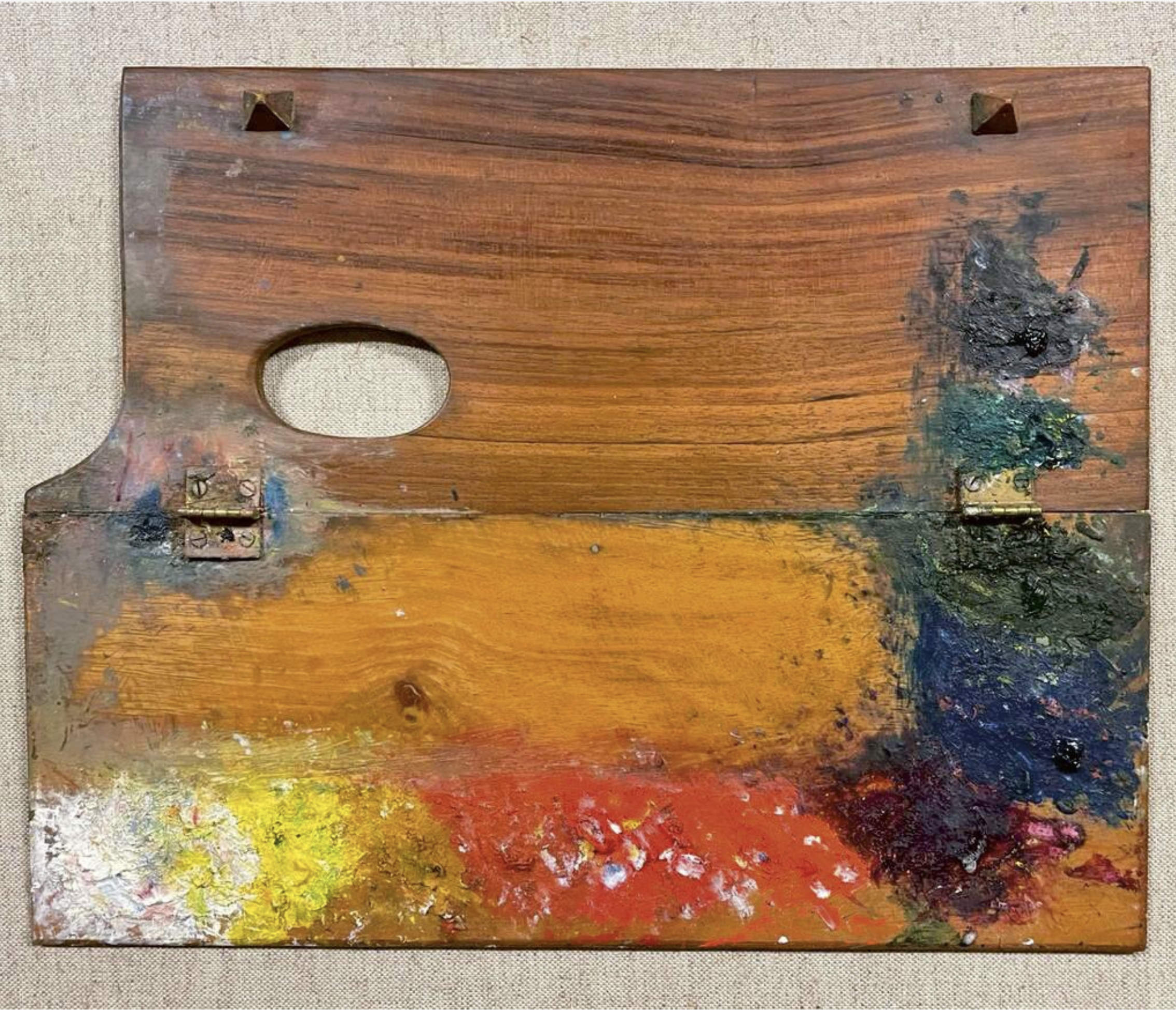
Palette by Caillebotte – Réhahn’s private collection

Réhahn is also a collector of manuscripts and rare editions by and about Alfred de Musset. He began this collection at the age of 17, with the acquisition of a first edition by the romantic poet. According to the Centre for Studies and Research Edit/Interpret (CÉRÉdI) of the University of Rouen, his collection now includes more than one hundred autograph manuscripts, rare editions, as well as unpublished letters and documents related to Musset's life and work, making it the largest private collection dedicated to this author. According to Beaux Arts Magazine, his collection also includes pieces such as the painting palette of Gustave Caillebotte, and the handwritten transcript of the duel between Édouard Manet and the critic Edmond Duranty, written by Émile Zola, who served as a witness.

== The Giving Back project ==
Réhahn's Giving Back project involves humanitarian and philanthropic efforts. After he photographed Madame Xong for the cover of his first book, he gave her a new boat to continue guiding tourists around the city. In September 2018, the BBC published an article with a portrait of An Phuoc titled The Photos that Change Lives. The article detailed the Giving Back project alongside initiatives by other photographers such as Ami Vitale and Kenro Izu. He also contributed to the CNCF foundation’s work in Vietnam, particularly in support of disadvantaged children.

In 2019, he opened the Co Tu Museum of Co Tu culture in the remote district of Tây Giang.

== Personal life ==
Réhahn was married at Machu Picchu in Peru in 2010. He has children.

== Gallery ==
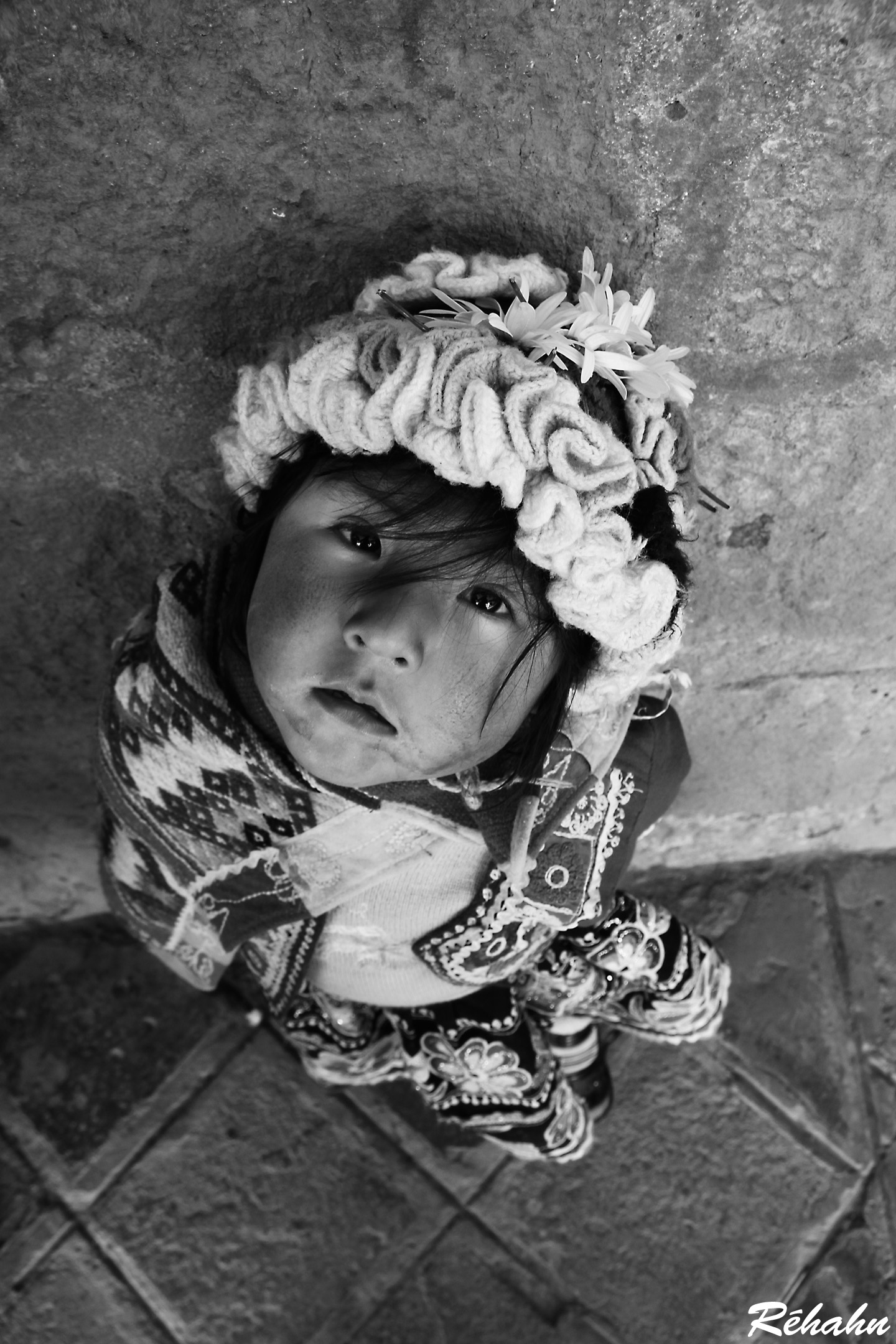
Young girl in Cusco, 2011

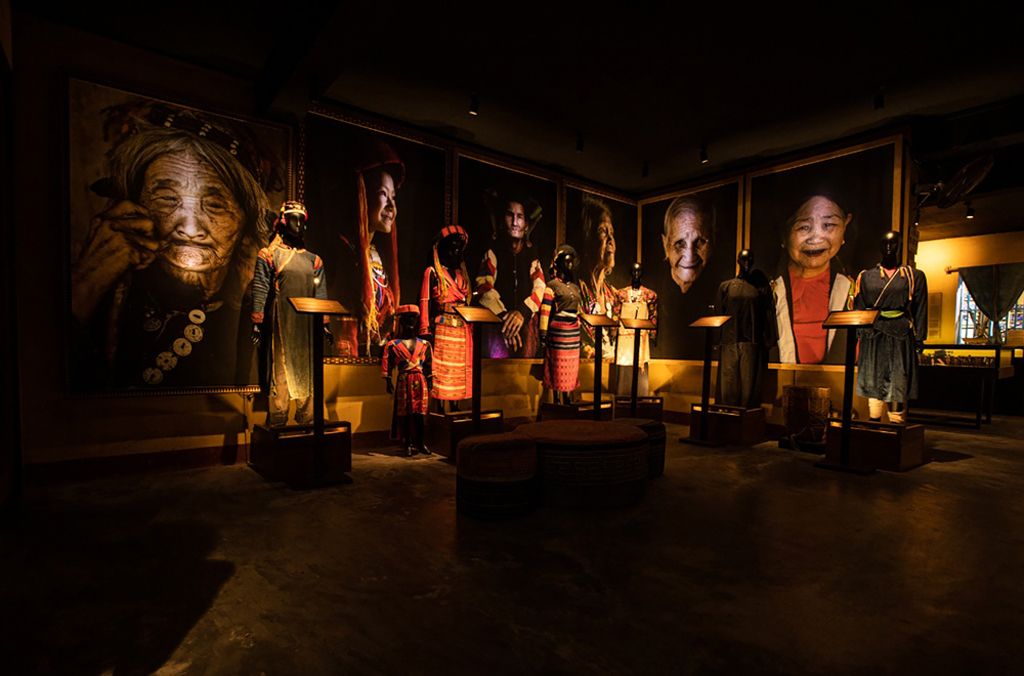
Precious Heritage Museum and Art Gallery

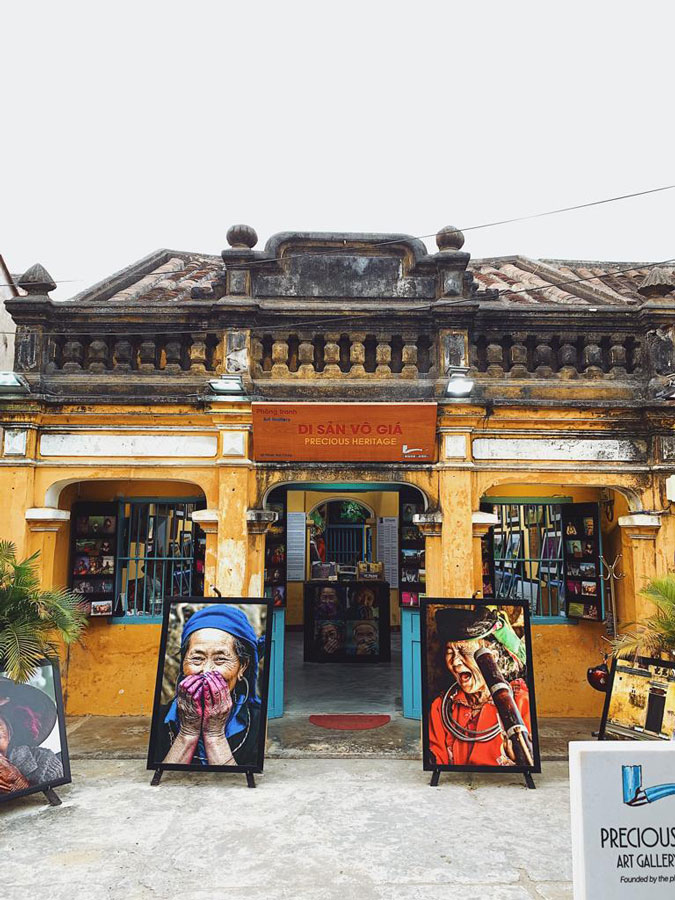
Precious Heritage Museum in Hội An

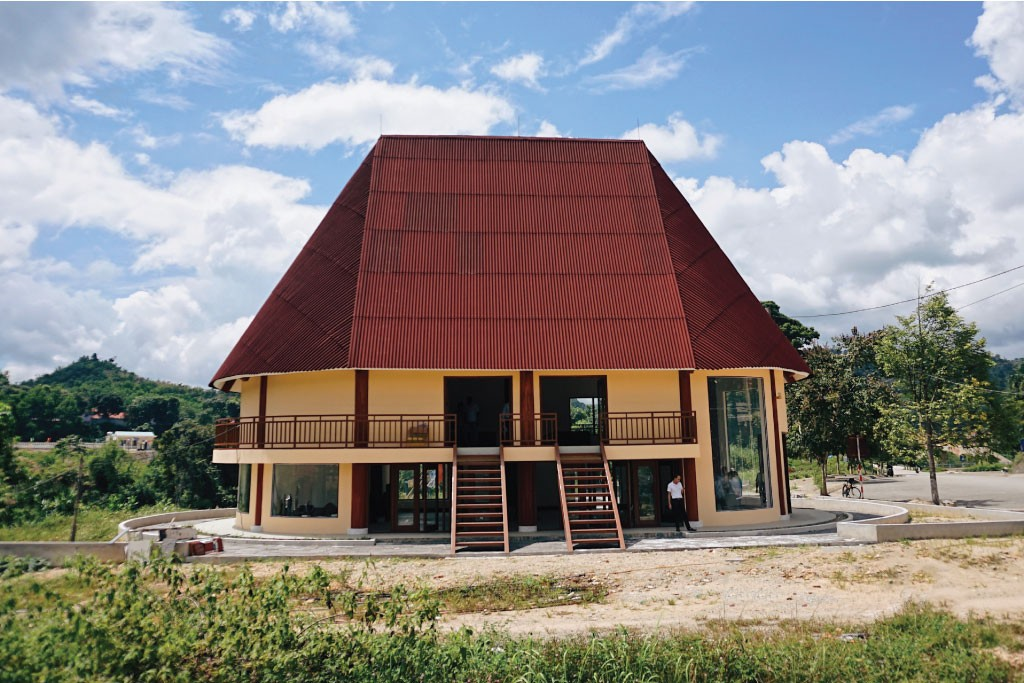
The Co Tu Museum
