= Ara Güler Museum =

- Ara Güler Müzesi
- Location within Istanbul
- Established: 16 August 2018; 8 years ago
- Location: Şişli, Istanbul, Turkey
- Coordinates: 41.05819°N 28.98075°E
- Type: Photography museum

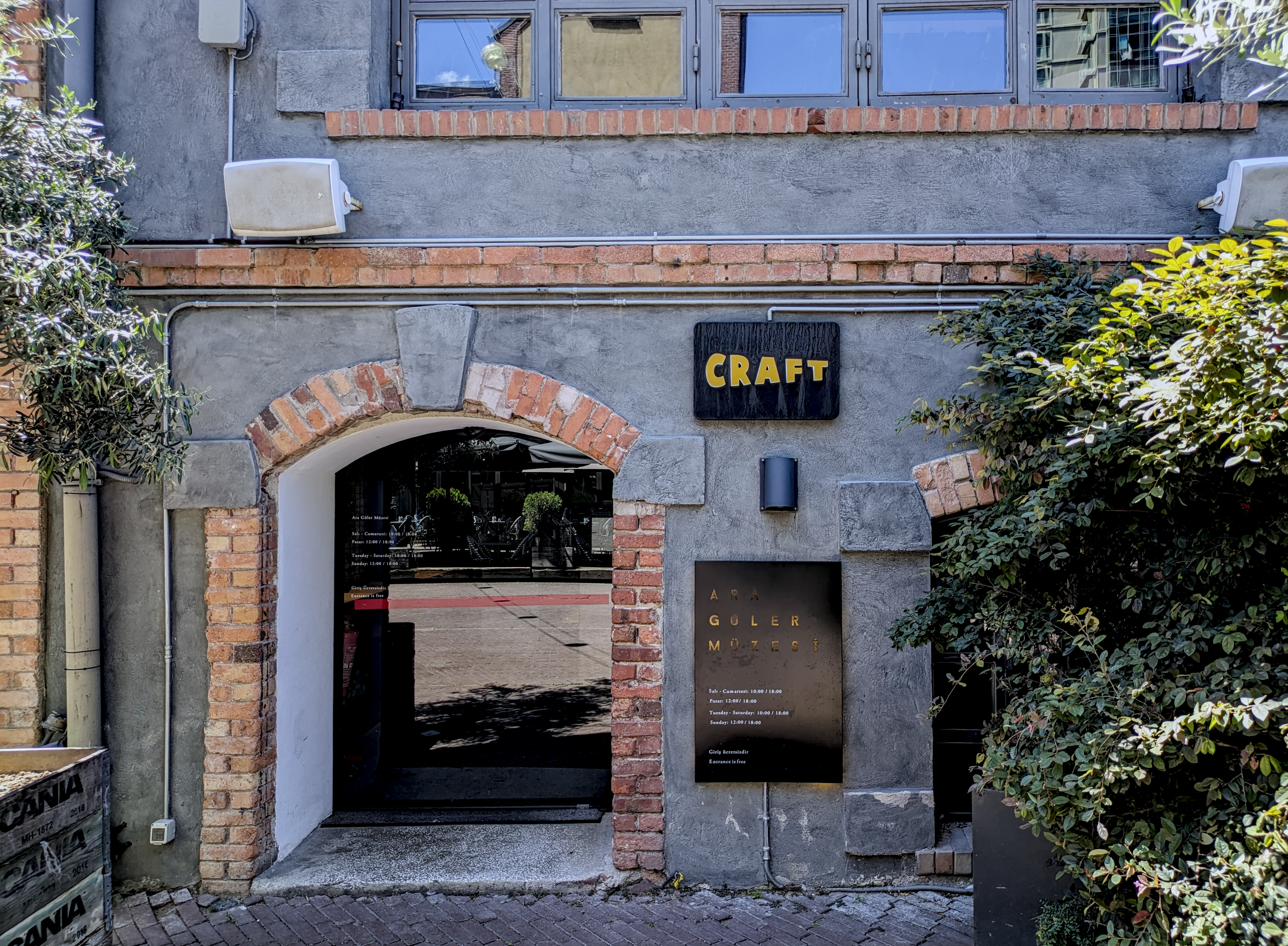
Museum entrance

Ara Güler Museum (Turkish: Ara Güler Müzesi) is a photography museum in Istanbul, Turkey, exhibiting photographs taken by the photojournalist Ara Güler. Established in 2018, the museum also houses an archive of his work.

== History ==
Ara Güler (16 August 1928 – 17 October 2018) was a noted Armenian-Turkish photojournalist, nicknamed "the Eye of Istanbul" or "the Photographer of Istanbul".

The foundation of the Ara Güler Museum goes back to the collaboration of Doğuş Group with Güler in 2016. It opened on 16 August 2018, on Güler's 90th birthday. The opening exhibition was titled "The Whistling Man" ("Islık Çalan Adam").

The Ara Güler Museum is located at Bomontiada in the Şişli district of Istanbul, Turkey. Güler's photographs focus on humans, Istanbul, and Turkey in the second half of the 20th century, which shaped the individual and social memory of this location.

The museum houses also an archive and research center ("Ara Güler Arşiv ve Araştırma Merkezi", AGAVAM). An archive team led by an art consultant at Doğuş Group carried out a two-year project on the classification, inventory, preservation, digitization and indexing of hundreds of thousands of Güler's works. The archive collections are available to photography enthusiasts and researchers through a portal.

Admission to the museum is free of charge.

== See also ==
- List of museums devoted to one photographer
