= Ara Güler =

Turkish photographer (1928–2018)

- Արա ԿիւլԷր
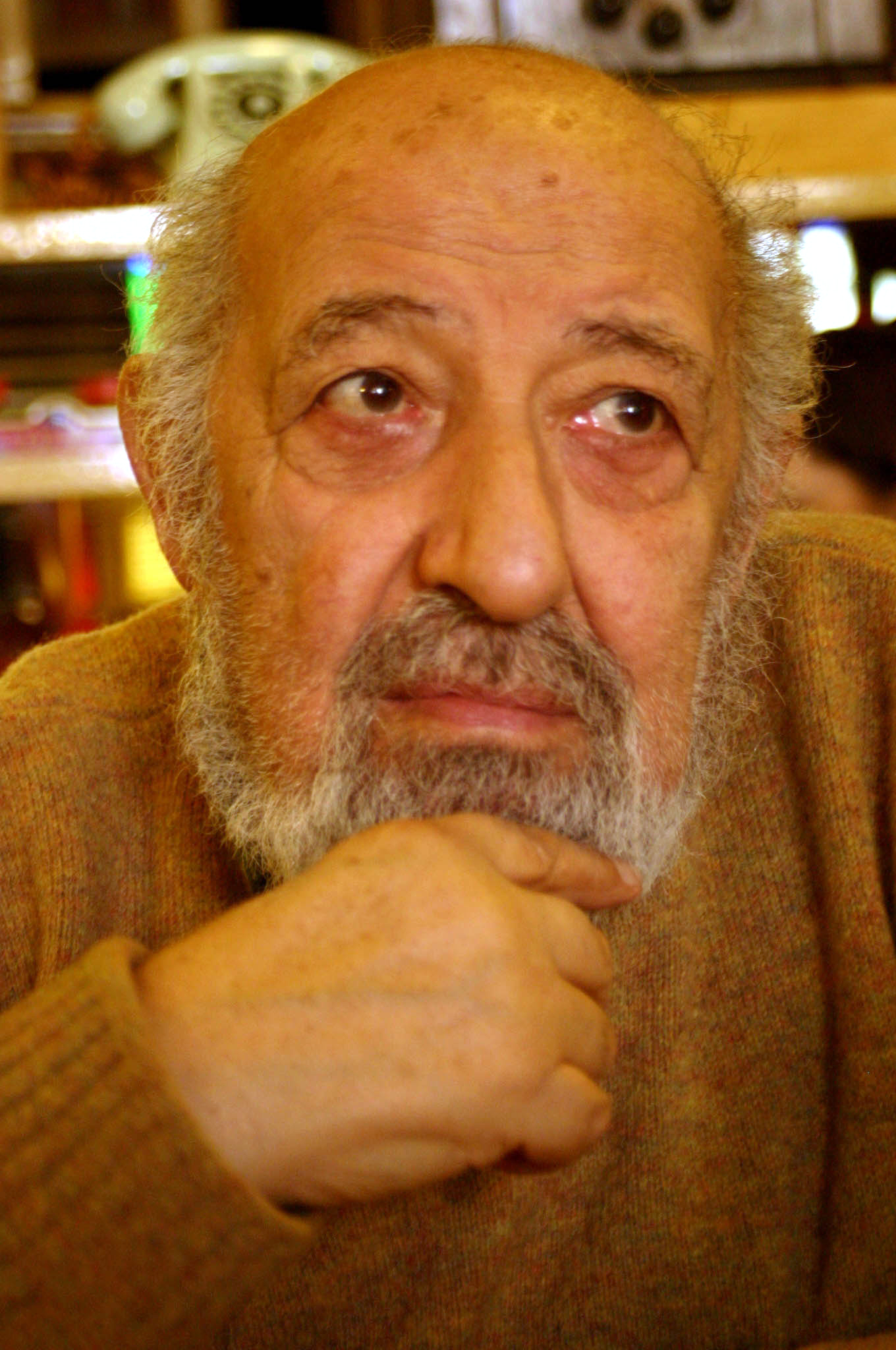
- Güler in 2007
- Born: Mıgırdiç Ara Derderyan; 16 August 1928; Istanbul, Turkey
- Died: 17 October 2018 (aged 90); Şişli, Istanbul, Turkey
- Occupation: Photojournalist
- Spouse: Suna Güler (m. 1984; died 2010)
- Awards: Légion d'honneur; Grand Prize of Culture and Arts; Lucie Award
- Website: www.araguler.com.tr

Ara Güler (Armenian: Արա Կիւլէր; born Mıgırdiç Ara Derderyan; 16 August 1928 – 17 October 2018) was a Turkish photojournalist of Armenian descent, nicknamed "the Eye of Istanbul". He is known for his black-and-white photographs of Istanbul, as well as photographic portraits of many politicians and artists, including Indira Gandhi, Maria Callas, Willy Brandt, Alfred Hitchcock, and Salvador Dalí.

== Early life and education ==
Ara Güler was born Mıgırdıç Aram Güleryan on 16 August 1928, in Istanbul, Turkey, the only child of Christian Armenian parents, Dacat Derderyan and Verjin Şahyan. Derderyan was a veteran of the Dardanelles campaign, and Şahyan was descended from a 400-year-old Istanbul dynasty, an Egyptian-Armenian family. Her father owned a ship repair business in the city. Güler grew up in the Beyoğlu district. A law passed in 1934 obliged them to take a Turkish surname, and Aram became Ara. His father owned a pharmacy on Istiklal Avenue, where most of the shops were run by Armenian and Greek families. Non-Muslims were persecuted by the Turkish Government, and in 1955, gangs looted stores owned by Greeks, Armenians, and Jews, who soon afterwards left Istiklal Avenue. Güler referred to himself as "Ottoman" rather than Turkish or Armenian.

Güler's father had a wide circle of friends from the art world of the period, and his early contact with this world inspired him to embark on a career in cinema. He first attended the Mkhitarist School and then Getronagan Armenian High School, in Karaköy, which was founded in 1886, and had many writers, intellectuals, architects, and musicians among its alumni. During his high school years, he worked in movie studios and attended drama courses held by Muhsin Ertuğrul, the founder of modern Turkish theatre.

He later studied economics at the University of Istanbul, but did not finish the course, instead leaving to perform his military service, after deciding to become a photojournalist.

== Career ==
In 1950 Güler joined the staff of the newspaper Yeni Istanbul as photojournalist. He then transferred to another newspaper, Hürriyet. In 1953, he met Henri Cartier-Bresson and Marc Riboud, who recruited him for the Magnum Photos agency in the early 1960s in Paris, which was founded in 1947 by Robert Capa, Cartier-Bresson, George Rodger, David Seymour, and others. Güler did not stay long with the group.

From 1954 until 1962, Güler worked as the chief of the photographic segment of Hayat magazine. In 1958, the American magazine company Time–Life opened a branch in Turkey, and Güler became its first correspondent for the Near East. Soon he received commissions from Paris Match, Stern in Germany, and The Sunday Times, in London. After completing his military service in 1961, Güler was employed by the Turkish magazine Hayat as head of its photographic department.

During his time with Magnum in the early 1960s, through his photographs he introduced the world to the archaeological remains on Mount Nemrut in southeastern Turkey, as well as the ancient city of Aphrodisias, a UNESCO World Heritage Site. He also photographed many other historical sites and structures in Turkey. He also photographed wars in Mindanao, Philippines, and Eritrea, as well as many churches in Armenia, during several visits there.

His most renowned photographs include many black and white pictures taken mostly with a Leica camera in Istanbul, mainly in the 1950s and 1960s. He became known as "the Eye of Istanbul" or "the Photographer of Istanbul".

In the 1960s, Güler's photographs were used to illustrate books by notable authors, and were displayed at various exhibitions throughout the world. In 1967, his works were exhibited at the Man and His World show in Canada, and in 1968 at Photokina Fair in Cologne, Germany. His photographs illustrated Lord Kinross's 1971 book about Hagia Sophia, published by Newsweek. The following year, his photographs were included in 10 Masters of Color Photography at the New York Museum of Modern Art. His book Türkei was published in Germany in 1970. His photos on art and art history were used in Time, Life, Horizon, Newsweek, and publications of the Swiss publisher Skira.

Güler travelled on assignment to Iran, Kazakhstan, Afghanistan, Pakistan, India, Kenya, New Guinea, and Borneo, as well as all parts of Turkey. In the 1970s he photographed politicians and artists such as Indira Gandhi, Maria Callas, John Berger, Bertrand Russell, Willy Brandt, Alfred Hitchcock, Ansel Adams, Imogen Cunningham, Marc Chagall, Salvador Dalí, Pablo Picasso, Arnold Toynbee, Winston Churchill, Cole Porter, Sophia Loren (1957), Orson Welles (1958), Arthur Rubinstein (1970), Soviet Armenian composer Aram Khachaturian, and several Turkish presidents, from İsmet İnönü tod Recep Tayyip Erdoğan (the latter in 2015).

From 1973 to 1975, Güler also worked in film, writing, directing, and producing the documentary Hero's End (also translated as The End of the Hero). It was based on a fictional account of the dismantling of the World War I veteran battlecruiser TCG Yavuz, which played a significant role in the Ottoman Empire's involvement in World War I. The film comprises a cinematic collage put together from a number of sources. Its unusual soundtrack includes compositions by Turkish folk musician Ruhi Su, and includes historical drawings and photos, as well as Güler's own documentary footage, in which he used actors.

In 1991, his photographs were used to illustrate the book The Sixth Continent, written by Cevat Şakir Kabaağaçlı for the Turkish Ministry of Foreign Affairs.

For many years he worked on photographing the works of 16th-century Ottoman chief architect and civil engineer Mimar Sinan, which were published in 1992 in the work Sinan: Architect of Suleyman the Magnificent and the Ottoman Golden Age, co-authored by Augusto Burelli and John Freely. His photographs of Sinan's work were also published under the title Turkish Style in the UK, US, and Singapore, and as Demeures Ottomanes de Turquie in France.

In 1994 Güler published A Photographical Sketch on Lost Istanbul, which he dedicated to his father "for his having bought me my first camera".

In 2009, he published Ara Guler's Istanbul. His friend, Nobel Prize-winning author Orhan Pamuk, wrote in his preface to the work:

Ara Güler's Istanbul is my Istanbul... The Istanbul of the 1950s and 1960s – its streets, pavements, shops and dirty, neglected factories; its ships, horse carts, buses, clouds, private taxis, shared taxis, buildings, bridges, chimneys, mists and people; and the soul in all these things, so difficult to recognise at first sight – is nowhere as well documented, preserved and protected as it is in the photographs of Ara Güler.

== Güler's philosophy and style ==
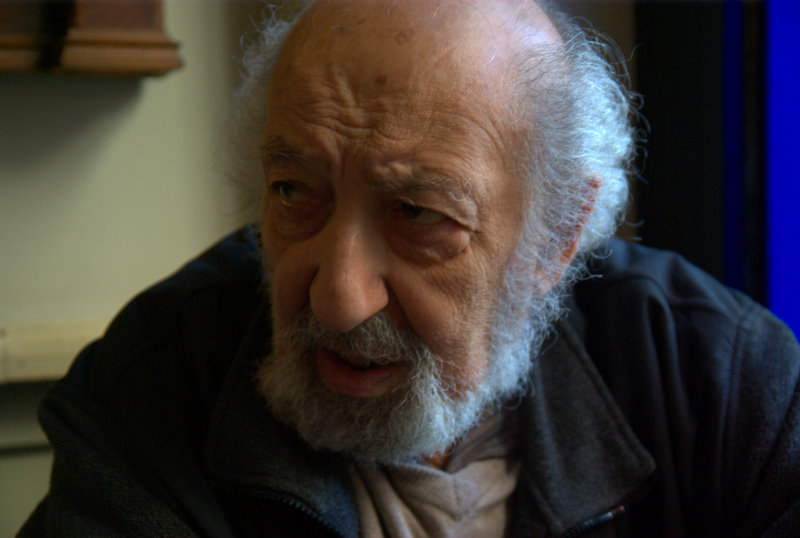
Ara Güler in 2008

Güler attached the greatest importance to human presence in his photographs, describing himself as a "visual historian". He said: "When I'm taking a picture of Aya Sofia, what counts is the person passing by who stands for life". He believed that photography should provide a memory of people, of their lives, and especially their suffering. While he considers that art lies, he believes that photography can only reflect reality. He embraced the identity of a photojournalist because he did not attach much value to photography as an artistic pursuit. His friend, writer Orhan Pamuk, for whose book his photographs provided illustrations, wrote of his work: "The crucial, defining characteristic of an Ara Guler photograph is the emotional correlation he draws between cityscapes and individuals".

== Notable exhibitions ==
Güler's exhibition Creative Americans, featuring his photographs of many famous Americans, was exhibited in many cities around the world.

In 1968, his work was included in an exhibition at the Museum of Modern Art in New York, titled Ten Masters of Color Photography. His photographs were also displayed in the Photokina trade show in Cologne, Germany.

In 2015, an exhibition titled In Focus: Ara Güler's Anatolia was mounted at the Arthur M. Sackler Gallery in Washington DC, which included many previously unseen photographs by Güler. The photos had been donated to the gallery in 1989 by Raymond Hare, who was US ambassador to Turkey from 1961 until 1965. Hare had been interested in Middle Eastern architecture, and his colleagues gifted him the collection upon his departure. The photographs were shot at locations across Anatolia, mainly of medieval Seljuk and Armenian monuments.

In 2019, a touring exhibition titled Ara Güler Photography Exhibition was organised by the Turkish Government in collaboration with Ara Güler Museum and the Archive and Research Center. Beginning at the Saatchi Gallery in London in April, the exhibition toured to Polka Galerie in Paris, France; and then the Tofuku-ji Temple in Kyoto, Japan, at the same time as the G20 Summit in Osaka was taking place. Its final display was during the United Nations General Assembly in New York. Turkish composer and pianist Fahir Atakoğlu, whose 2008 album Istanbul in Blue featured a photo by Güler, performed at the opening ceremony of the exhibition. After New York, opened at Trastevere museum in Rome], Italy, before its last location, the Turkish Embassy in Mogadishu, Somalia.

Ara Güler: Two Archives, One Selection: Tracing Ara Güler's Footsteps in Istanbul was shown at the Istanbul Museum of Modern Art from 29 May to 17 November 2019.

In August to November 2024, the Museum of Islamic Art in Doha, Qatar, exhibited a major survey of his work titled In the Footsteps of Ara Güler: Exploring the Photographer's Legacy. The exhibition included 155 photographs, along with correspondence, cameras and equipment, and various ephemera from the Ara Güler Archive and Research Center. It was curated by Sheikha Maryam Al Thani and the Ara Güler Museum.

== Recognition ==
Güler was presented in the British 1961 Photography Yearbook, and in the same year was accepted as the only Turkish member to the American Society of Magazine Photographer (later renamed the American Society of Media Photographers). The Swiss magazine Camera honoured him with a special issue.

He was widely recognised and celebrated both in Turkey and internationally as a master of photojournalism and photography.

In 1980, a collection of his photographs was published as a book by Karacan Publishing.

In 2017, Nezih Tavlas published a comprehensive biography of Güler, titled Photojournalist: The Life Story of Güler.

=== Awards and honours ===
- 1961: Named one of the seven best photojournalists in the world by the Photo Annual Anthology, published in London
- 1962: Master of Leica
- 1962: Subject of a special issue of the journal Camera ("then the most important photography publication in the world")
- 1979: Winner, award in photojournalism from the Turkish Journalists' Association
- 1999: "Photographer of the Century", Turkey
- 2000: Légion d'honneur, Officier des Arts et des Lettres, France
- 2004: Honorary doctorate, Yıldız Technical University, Istanbul
- 2005: Grand Prize of Culture and Arts, Turkey
- 2009: Lucie Award for Lifetime Achievement, New York
- 2009: Médaille de la Ville de Paris
- 2011: Grand Prize of Culture and Tourism
- 2013: Honorary doctorate, Mimar Sinan Fine Arts University
- 2014: Honorary doctorate, Boğaziçi University
- 2016: Leica Hall of Fame Award
- January 2018: Street in Istanbul named after Ara Güler

== Death and legacy ==
Güler died of a heart attack on 17 October 2018. He had been suffering from kidney failure and was being treated with dialysis.

President Erdogan contacted his family to offer his condolences, saying that "Güler would always be remembered for his work", and the President of Armenia, Armen Sarkisyan, also paid tribute to him. A memorial service for him was held in Galatsaray Square on 20 October. He was buried in the Şahyan-Güler family plot in the Şişli Armenian Cemetery, after a funeral service at the Üç Horan Armenian Church (Church of the Three Altars) in Beyoğlu.

Writer and close friend Orhan Pamuk, writing in The New York Times after his death, called him the greatest photographer of modern Istanbul", and stated: "The crucial, defining characteristic of an Ara Güler photograph is the emotional correlation he draws between cityscapes and individuals".

The Ara Cafe in Beyoğlu, Istanbul, was opened by Güler in 2001 on the ground and basement floors of a three-storey building where he lived and stored his works. As of 2026 the restaurant continues to exist, and has maintained its original interiors, as well as its stained-glass windows. Its walls are decorated with his photographs.

=== Collections ===
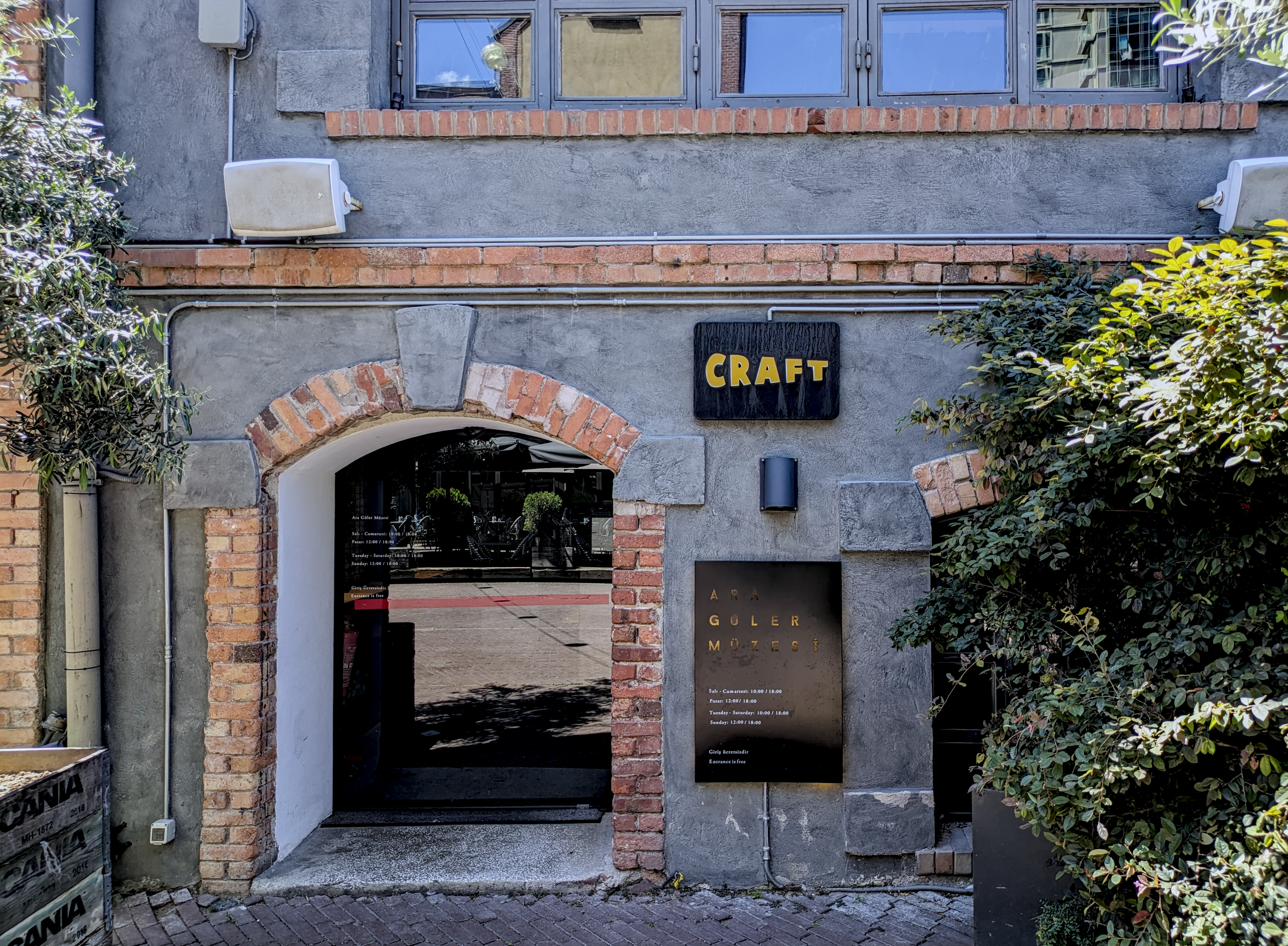
Ara Güler Museum, Istanbul

Photographs by Güler were collected in an archive, containing some 800,000 photographic slides. Many of these are exhibited in the Ara Güler Museum in the Şişli district of Istanbul, which was established on 16 August 2018, shortly before his death. In 2022, the museum was granted "Special Museum" status by the Ministry of Culture and Tourism.

Güler's work is held by the National Library of France in Paris; the George Eastman Museum in Rochester, New York; University of Nebraska–Lincoln's Sheldon Museum of Art; and Museum Ludwig and Das imaginäre Photo-Museum in Köln, Germany.

== Personal life ==
In 1975 Güler married Perihan Sarıöz; they later divorced. In 1984 he married Suna Taşkıran; she died in 2010. He had no children.

== Selected publications ==
- Creative Americans (1972)
- Ara Güler: Photographs
- Ara Güler's Movie Directors
- Sinan: Architect of Suleyman the Magnificent and the Ottoman Golden Age (Text by Burelli, Augusto Romano and Freely, John). WW Norton & Co. Inc., 1992. ISBN 0-500-34120-6
- Living in Turkey (1992)
- Ara Guler's Istanbul Thames & Hudson, 2009. ISBN 9780500543863
