= Mohamed Nagy (artist) =

Egyptian artist (1888–1956)

- Born: 17 January 1888; Alexandria, Egypt
- Died: 1956 (aged 67–68); Alexandria, Egypt
- Relatives: Effat Nagy

Mohamed Nagy (Egyptian Arabic: محمد ناجي), also spelled Mohamed Nagi and in Standard Arabic as Muhammad Naji (17 January 1888 – 1956) was an Egyptian artist. He is considered to be among the founders of modern Egyptian art, and was responsible for establishing the modern painting school of Egypt. He was the recipient of the golden prize of the Salon du Paris for his "Egypt Renaissance". His other works, which have been well received, are the murals of "Ancient Egyptian medicine, Medieval medicine, Folk medicine, and Inauguration of Mohamed Ali".

After Nagy's death, Tharwat Okasha, the Minister of Culture of Egypt, opened the Mohamed Nagy Museum on 13 July 1968.

== Early life ==
Mohammed Nagi was born to an Egyptian father and Turkish mother, in the Mediterranean city of Alexandria on 17 January 1888. He displayed a keen interest in the art forms of poetry, folk arts and painting from a young age, and also in music (playing violin and lute). From 1906 to 1910, he studied law at Lyon. From 1910 to 1914 he enrolled in art studies at the Academy of Fine Arts in Florence, Italy, the first student to do so from Egypt. Claude Monet (1840–1926) was his teacher in the art of European Impressionism. The painter's sister is Effat Nagy, also a well known painter in Egypt.

== Professional life and legacy ==
Nagy returned to Alexandria during the World War I, when he was fired by a "radical approach towards classic rules of art" and concentrated his painting on Impressionism. His paintings were a mix of Egypt's traditional and the modern art forms. Nature was his theme, and art work on walls and permanent surfaces done by artists of Ancient Egypt enthused him.

In 1939 Nagy started his ambitious project titled "Alexandria School" when he headed the Museum of Modern Art as its director. In 1952, to give shape to his project, he decided to build an atelier in a plot of land which he purchased from Hadayek El Ahram. He pursued this project till he died in his studio in 1956. In 1962, the Ministry of Culture bought his atelier and then Tharwat Okasha formally inaugurated the Mohamed Nagy Museum on 13 July 1968. The museum has 1,200 paintings and sketches, including 40 of Nagy's oil paintings his sister donated to the museum.
