= Contemporary art in Egypt =

Egyptian art scene, videos, paintings, sculptures

Contemporary art in Egypt refers to visual art, including installations, videos, paintings, or sculptures, developed in the Egyptian art scene. While the contemporary art scene is mainly concentrated in Cairo and Alexandria, it is developing fast with the emergence of spaces for artists, and support from the public or from abroad. Many Egyptian artists use the Egyptian contemporary art scene as a ramp toward the international art scenes.

== History ==
While Egyptian contemporary art has always centered around national political and social aspects, there has clearly been some phases that accentuated other aspects present in Egyptian artists' work.

=== Pioneer generation and modern art: 1920–1956 ===
This era was the establishing stage of the contemporary art in Egypt. Most of the intellectual in the first part of the 20th century were going to foreign school, whether located in Egypt or abroad (mostly Europe), and pioneers were routed in a European tradition. While it emerged late, mainly because of the Islamic ban on pictorial art, Egyptian contemporary art strongly focused on the national aspect. Through history, traditions and national culture, contemporary artists were emerging mainly in Cairo and in Alexandria.

It is during those decades that Egyptian modern art, institutionalized by the creation of the Prince Youssef Kamel Art School in 1908, began to shift toward a more contemporary composant, giving birth to Egyptian contemporary art.

Main artists :

- Mohamed Nagi
- Mahmoud Mokhtar (1891–1934)
- Ramy Asaad
- Ragheb Ayad (1892–1982)

=== Nasserism and Egyptian art ===
This period is characterized by several events. First, the creation of Israel in 1948, followed by the war, has marked the spirits of Egyptians artists. Nasser's accession to the presidency also played a role in the transformation of the contemporary art scene in Egypt.

The first consequence is the dissociation from the West for many Egyptian artists. This is caused by the support from the West during the creation of the state of Israel. The contemporary art hence took its influence from the rising Palestinian cause.

The presidency of Nasser also had a strong impact. In addition to more and more engaged art, contemporary artists started to express through their work the panarabism Nasser was trying to implement. The main theme of this era was the Arab unity, not only after the Palestinian cause, but also by the expansion of contemporary art through the Arab world. The aspects of contemporary art at this period have shifted from Western influence to common Arab culture.

Main artists :

- Abdel Hadi Al Gazzar (1925–1966)
- Inji Efflatoun (1924–1989)
- Kamal Amin (1923–1979)

=== 1970–2000 : reemergence of Islamic aspects ===
Anwar Sadat accessed the presidency in 1970, and in order to counteract the nasserists left wing, allowed the coming back of Islamism. At the same period, contemporary art has seen the emergence of Islamic aspects in the works, sometimes even stronger than social and political aspects, through the introduction of calligraphy, or through works depicting Islamic historic events.

The regional aspect was also stronger, where regional Arab culture was a source of inspiration for artists. The emergence of Islamic aspects also played a role in reinforcing the pan-arabism feeling.

Main artists :

- Taha Hussein (1929 - ... )
- Atteya Mostafa

=== The 2000–2011 era ===
In 1998, the Townhouse Gallery was launched. This marks the beginning of a new era in Egyptian contemporary Art toward the will to democratize the art to any audience. New mediums of art emerging, such as video or installations, and the number of open and free art spaces is rising mainly in Cairo and Alexandria.

However, this development of the Egyptian contemporary art is still facing censorship from the government, the lack of funding from official sources, and the influence of foreign curators on the work exposed.

== Egyptian arts post-2011 revolution ==
The 2011 Egyptian revolution and the fall of former Egyptian President, Hosni Mubarak, ushered a new era of arts that reflects new social and political environment. A large movement of uprisings over the Middle East and North Africa called "Arab Spring" or Egyptian Spring from 2010 to 2013 created political change in social life as well as in the art production. The self-immolation of Mohamed Bouazizi in Tunisia was the commencement of Arab Spring, leading to widespread protests. "The revolution triggered a new public culture" From the beginning of the revolution, artists played a significant role in the protests. Likewise, many genres of arts emerged such as street art, music and what so called 'electro sha'bi' or 'Techno sha'bi'. Artists used arts to document and capture the essence of the revolution. They also distribute their arts through on- line and social networks. Graffiti and political song are among the most powerful tools in the new public culture. This movement was an inspiration to many and created the opportunity for many artists to collaborate on larger-scale projects like murals and installations.

=== Graffiti ===
Graffiti comes from the Greek word "Graphien", which means "to write". Graffiti today has been defined as "the act of inscribing or drawing on walls for the purpose of communicating a message to the general public". In Egypt, graffiti is dating back to the Pharonic period when the Egyptians used to document their daily life on the temple walls. In modern-day Egypt, and during Mubarak era, graffiti was illegal and classified as a "misdemeanor".

Before 2011 revolution, graffiti served as a channel to promote the reclamation of public space, via positive cultural and social exchange. The graffiti were mostly featuring religious, advertisements or romantic declarations, even though a couple of urban artists were already active. The birth of "revolutionary graffiti" in Egypt took place during the first days of the revolution when Egyptians protesters convey uncensored political messages against Mubarak's regime. At this time, artists drew on cultural memory, slogans, and historical figures to add impact to their messages. For example, Bahia Shehab's work called "A Thousand Times No," used the Arabic letters of "Lam-Alif" to convey the message of resistance and rejection of different forms of oppression. Common themes in the artworks included calls for the fall of the regime, depictions of martyrs, as well as critiques of political figures and the military. Social Media also contributed to the role of connecting material spaces and spreading messages to others, despite the government's control of the physical spaces. Since the toppling of Mubarak, graffiti has become an alternative media channel, documenting different political events that taking place in the country and paying homage to activists who died. Some streets inside and outside Cairo turned into graffiti hubs such as Mohamed Mahmoud Street in Cairo and Al Gomhuria in Assiut.

Meanwhile, graffiti reflects the controversial political debate in Egypt post revolution and during Muslim Brotherhood ruling era. On one hand, the streets around Tahrir square have become a graffiti gallery of opposing the current regime of Mohamed Morsi who is accused of failing to reform post-revolution Egypt while consolidating power in the hands of his Muslim Brotherhood. On the other hand, in some districts inside Cairo and Assiut, only pro- Morsi graffiti exist in streets' walls.

Egyptian graffiti artists are also raising awareness on socio-political subjects as diverse as corruption, poverty, media brainwashing or sexual harassment. Moreover, they use graffiti as a tool to beautify slum areas in Cairo, restoring a sense of ownership, pride and hope to its residents.

Contemporary Egyptian graffiti are complex cultural products of an urban self-aware society that finds itself at a crossroad. The revolution, as Ursula Lindsey points out "has accelerated the valorization of Egypt's burgeoning youth culture and its "underground" and "independent" artists". These artists are committed to freely expressing themselves, engaging in a civic dialog with the society, re-appropriating in this way a public space from which the previous authoritarian regime deprived the Egyptians. The large corpus of graffiti available shows a high incidence of national and gender related imagery highlighting the political and social themes that engage different sides of the Egyptian society. Through graffiti and its predominant imagery we can catch a glimpse of how the Egyptians reconstruct national symbols and how events of the revolution are memorialized not only preventing them from oblivion but transforming them into symbols of national identity. As Susan Philips indicates "if graffiti is a window into a culture (...) then it is the same window that people use to look in on themselves as they actively construct the guidelines and concerns of their lives". What Cairene graffiti show us is that the Egyptian (post-) revolutionary society valorizes its recent and remote past and cultural heritage to which its identity is tributary. Nonetheless, as witnesses of important social and political change, the walls of Cairo contribute to transforming the actors of the revolution into symbols of cohesion and mobilization while keeping their memory alive and promoting the social and political causes they stand for.

=== Social Media's Role ===
Social Media was a useful tool for Egyptian protestors because it is relatively easy to access as it does not require a charge, license, or affiliations to gain access and allows for quick, widespread, instant communication. For example, Social media had many uses during the time of the revolution, helping to coordinate protests against the government through apps like Twitter and Facebook. Social media can be used to set up in-person or virtual meetings allowing followers to be informed about events and news while remaining anonymous. Social media was also able to help journalists and reports find contacts. Even with efforts being made to attempt to block and control social media usage, Egyptian protestors used social media as a tool for their reasons. There was a five-day blackout for the internet, mobile phone networks, and social media; however, it did not stop the revolution. Facebook is a very popular network in Egypt that had a high increase in users after the beginning of the revolution in 2011. Having an online space created a safer environment for protestors to meet. A social activist by the name of Ahmed stated that online activist meetings replace physical meeting spots that could have been interrupted by police. Social media reached local audiences as well as international audiences, allowing the movement to maintain momentum as well as attract attention. Both street art and graffiti are inherently ephemeral or temporary, often being replaced and painted over, but with the help of social media, these messages can continue to me spread to a larger audience.

==== Graffiti artists ====
- Alaa Awad
- Aya Tarek
- Chico
- El Teneen
- Ganzeer
- Keizer
- Monalisa Brigades
- El Zeft

=== Political songs and music ===
The purpose of political songs is to move and unify the crowds in a state that 'Durkheim has called "collective effervescence". Egyptian political song is always playing a crucial role at provoking the public to be politically active. For example, the song Patriotic Port Said by El Tanbura refers to the 1956 Suez Crisis, when Israel, France and the United Kingdom invaded Egypt after President Gamal Abdel Nasser nationalized the Suez Canal. El Tanbura is a collective of musicians from the city of Port Said on the Suez Canal, formed by Zakariyya Ahmad in 1978. They also performed other nationalist songs in various political and time phases.

It is impossible to discuss Egyptian political songs after 25 January Revolution without recalling the role played by pioneer musician Sheikh Imam in politics in the 1970s and 1980s. "Sheikh Imam is a major pillar of the Arabic political song which motivated thousands of workers and intellectuals rebellious against decadent times and ambitious for better tomorrow." When Sheikh Imam met the poet Ahmed Fouad Negm in 1962, the two formed an influential duo and developed the popular political song. The 1967 War brought the duo to reflect the impact of f Arab defeat in their revolutionary songs Misr Ya Bahia [Pretty Egypt], Shayid Kussurak [Build Your Palaces], Ghifara [Che Ghivara], El Fallahin [the Peasants] and Mur El Kalam [Bitter Talk] "The music of Sheikh Imam was marked by a form of totality that made his political song travel beyond the geographical location of its origin." Many other popular Egyptian singers contribute in political song such as Um Kalthoum, Abdel Halim Hafez, and Abdel Wahab who composed "Al watan Al Akbar" The Greatest Homeland in 1960 and it was produced to celebrate the union of Egypt & Syria into the United Arab Republic.

In 2011, Egypt witnesses a new and distinguished wave of political songs, in which unknown young singers and underground bands played a significant role to keep the protesters' spirit high during 18 days revolution. Singers such as Ramy Essam, Amir Eid and Hani Adel, Rami Donjewan and other bands like Eskenderella used to rock Tahrir square with their political lyrics and influential music. These singers continue to tackle Egyptian social and political issues in their songs. They drew on the work of poets such as Galal El-Behairy.

Another important and emergent genre of contemporary Egyptian music is Mahragan (مهرجان) ("festival") or Mahraganat (مهرجانات) (pl. "festivals"), which originated in working-class neighborhoods and in particular from the 'ashwa'iyyat (shanty towns) on the peripheries of Cairo and Alexandria. This genre, which started to appear on YouTube in 2007, has gained immense popularity among the youngest generations of Egyptians. Additionally, in the last several years the genre has gained international traction through numerous international tours and various collaborations with European Electronic artists. The music has also been called techno-sha'bi or electro-sha'bi, which refers to the older genre of sha'bi (شعبي) ("folk") music. However, many Mahragan artists have resisted this designation, as they see their music as something completely new. Some artists, such as Okka and Ortega, have argued that Mahragan is more closely aligned with American Rap/Hip-Hop than with other Egyptian musical forms. Mahragan, usually recorded in makeshift home studios and traded via YouTube and USB sticks, is a mix of either sung (often with auto-tune) or rapped vocals over sampled beats that provide a heavy, energetic, and fast-paced musical soundtrack. Some of the most popular mahragan performers are Figo, Sadat, Alaa' Fifty Cent, DJ Amr Haha (often stylized as 7a7a), Islam Fanta, Weza, Okka and Ortega.

== Themes ==
=== Ancient history ===
Artists took their inspiration in Egyptian pharaonic heritage, which is omnipresent in Egypt, through paintings, architecture or sculptures. The main occurring symbol is the pyramid, repeatedly used by artists, as a way of expressing the Egyptian national identity.

Mostafa Abdel Moity's work, the Pyramid motif is strongly present in most of his sculptures. He often represents the three Great Pyramids of Gizeh. This is a way a reaffirming the strong influence of Egyptian ancient history.

The Nile is also a very recurring aspect of Egyptian culture and beliefs, a sign of fertility, but also in Egyptian contemporary art. Mythological stories from Ancient Egypt often use the Nile as the center of the story, and so do Egyptian contemporary artists.

=== Religion ===
The religious aspect is also repeatedly used in Egyptian contemporary Art either through the form of calligraphy or the description of Islamic events . Classical calligraphy is a source of inspiration for a lot of artworks, and its evolution through the centuries has made it a rich theme in Egyptian contemporary art. In works by Taha Hussein, the aesthetic aspect of the calligraphy is studied by the artist, mostly superposition of letters written in unreadable calligraphy.

=== Women ===
Women are also a frequent theme in Egyptian contemporary art. Inji Efflatoun, in her paintings often depicts women in different positions. This represent the burden Egyptian women are carrying since their birth because of their gender. Injy Efflatoun was well known to be a feminist, fighting for women rights through her work. Gazbia Sirry is another beloved Egyptian artist whose depictions of women made her one of the most pivotal activists for women's rights in the region.

== Institutions ==
=== Museums ===
- Museum of Modern Egyptian Art
- Museum of Modern Art—Port Said
- Alexandria Museum of Fine Arts
- Mohamed Mahmoud Khalil Museum

=== Nonprofit art centres ===
- Alexandria Contemporary Arts Forum (ACAF): Founded in 2005 in Alexandria, the ACAF is provides exhibitions, lectures, symposia, screening and a community library of contemporary arts publications. In 2008, ACAF launched Cleotronica, a festival for media art and socio-culture, presenting a diverse set of projects ranging from virtual art to tactical media, from public intervention to design. The aim was to challenge the dividing line between "new media" and plastic arts.
- L'Atelier Alexandrie: Founded in 1935, this is a very active NGO in Alexandria contemporary Art scene, which goal is to connect artists from different horizons and to offer to the public a chance to go into contemporary Art. They are a member of the BJCEM, The International Association of the Biennial of Young Artists from Europe and the Mediterranean. (Bienniale des Jeunes Createurs d'Europe et de la Méditerranée).
- Darb 1718: Founded in 2008, Darb 1718 aims to provide an alternative exhibition space in Cairo, and to be a platform for the burgeoning contemporary art movement in Egypt. It supports young and emerging artists by facilitating their interactions with established regional and international artists. It also hosts various programs, debates, workshops, films, concerts and educational initiatives.
- The Townhouse Gallery: Established in 1997, the Townhouse Gallery is today one of the region's leading institutions for contemporary art, including visual art as well as film, theatre and music. Beside acting as a space for exhibition and performance, it also carries out a wide range of community development programs, as well as educational programs.
- Cairo Contemporary Dance Center: CCDC is an independent space for contemporary dance in Egypt, and the only Contemporary Dance school in Africa and the MENA region, providing a 3-year professional training for young dancers, performers, choreographers and teachers.

=== Commercial galleries ===
The number of commercial galleries is constantly rising. Here are a few examples :

- Adsum Art Consultancy
- Al Masar Gallery
- Art D'Egypte
- Arteology
- ArtTalks
- Darb 1718
- Karim Francis
- Luxor Art Gallery
- Mashrabia Gallery of Contemporary Art
- Picasso Art Gallery
- Picasso East Art Gallery
- Safarkhan Art Gallery
- Samah Art Gallery
- TAM Gallery formerly The Arts-Mart Gallery
- Townhouse Gallery
- Ubuntu Art Gallery
- Zamalek Art Gallery

== Visual art ==
=== Visual artists ===
- Alaa Awad: Born in 1981 Alaa Awad is an Egyptian artist and muralist based in Luxor, Egypt. Awad is an Egyptian artist known for his public murals in Cairo and Luxor, Egypt. He is well known for his murals created on Mohamed Mahmoud Street in Cairo, Egypt in 2012 during the Egyptian Revolution, which took media attention. His public murals and paintings encompass the history, dignity and charisma of the Egyptian people. He has worked internationally, in both solo exhibitions for his oil paintings and outdoor public murals.
- Armen Agop: Egyptian artist Armen Agop is one of the most important contemporary artists from Africa and the Middle East. Born and raised in Cairo, he is known for his contemplative paintings and sculptures derived from his exploration of ancient spiritual heritages. Agop refers to the environmental influences as the hidden source of his interest in simplicity itself. The endlessness and nothingness evoked from the desert are characteristics that triggered his approach to simplicity. He integrates a meditative practice in his working process pioneering contemporary spiritual works. Despite being non representative his works are distinguished from the western abstraction by stimulating the viewer to contemplate and observe the unseen. He graduated from the Faculty of Fine Arts from Helwan University, in Cairo in 1992. In 2000, his national recognition was confirmed when he was given the Prix de Rome (State Award for Artistic Creativity). After moving to Italy, he started to exhibit worldwide and gained international recognition.
- Aya Tarek: Born in Alexandria, Egypt in 1989, Aya Tarek is a painter, street artist and illustrator with an exciting portfolio of diverse art projects, feature films and art collaborations in countries ranging from São Paulo to Frankfurt. Her work explores the different interchanges within modes of urban communication and the dynamic of a public space. Using a vibrant, comic derived aesthetic, and often working through site-specific murals, she aims to trigger a humorous sense of controversy, investigating different ideas pertaining to the different public contexts. Tarek has showcased her artwork in various exhibitions and events around the world, including Omar A Sharif Mural, Antigel Festival, Geneva (2018), Sprezzatura, SOMA Art, Cairo (2018), Aya in America, Portland (2017), Paper Trail, Gypsum Gallery, Cairo (2017), Objects in the Mirror Are Closer than They Appear, SOMA Art, Cairo (2017), Afreaka Festival, São Paulo (2016), World Premiere of a New Mural by Aya Tarek, USF Contemporary Art Museum, Florida (2015), Urban Art Biennale, Weltkulturerbe Völklinger Hütte, Völklingen (2015), Djerbahood, Itinerrance Gallery, Djerba (2014), Vagabonds Congress, Theatre RMPH, Stuttgart (2014), Cityleaks, Cologne (2013), White Walls, Beirut Art Centre, Beirut (2012), Arabic Graffiti & Egyptian Street Art in Frankfurt, Frankfurt (2012), Ankh Project, ITP Berlin (2011), Graffiti: Style/ History/ Experience, Goethe Institute, Alexandria (2011), Bytes and Pieces, Sharjah Art Foundation, Sharjah (2011), Shopping Malls, Alexandria Contemporary Art Forum, Alexandria (2010), PICK 4, Townhouse Gallery, Cairo (2009).
- Britt Boutros Ghali: Born in Norway in 1937, and living in Egypt for over 40 years working in a studio houseboat on the Nile River, Cairo. Boutros-Ghali has been awarded the St. Olav Order by King Haakon of Norway, the highest order given to artists in Norway, and her works have been displayed internationally throughout her career.
- Mohamed Abla: Born in 1953 in Belqas, near Mansoura, Egypt, Abla is an internationally celebrated artist working in paint and sculpture. He graduated from the Faculty of Fine Arts in Alexandria in 1977 and traveled to Europe in 1978. He spent seven years there, studying sculpture in Zurich and graphics in Vienna, educating himself on the schools of modern art throughout the continent.
- Nazir Tanbouli: Born in 1971 in Alexandria into a family of artists (his uncle is painter Ibrahim El Tanbouli and his great-uncle is Lotfy El Tanbouli) Nazir Tanbouli studied at the University of Alexandria for his BFA in Expressive Art, and then at Camberwell College of the University of the Arts London for his MFA. Tanbouli founded the first contemporary mural painting crew in Egypt in the 90s, challenging the older tradition of mural painting (associated with the state) fusing pop art and transnational cultural forms with Egyptian aesthetics. He exhibited in Egypt, Europe and Latin America before moving to the UK. Ignoring trends and fashions Tanbouli has stubbornly stuck to being a painter, and his work continues to explore and transfigure Egyptian motifs in conjunction with current global issues. He works in painting, mural and drawing, producing exhibitions, books and unusual projects. In 2012 he was responsible for the "biggest street art project by one artist" in the UK. This project is the subject of a documentary 'Taking Over the King's Land', released in 2013. In 2012 Tanbouli won the UAL Creative Enterprise Award
- Sameh Al Tawil: Born in 1978 in Cairo is an Egyptian New media artist and photographer known for his contributions in the exploration of political and human rights issues in the Middle East. His work combines film, performance, digital installations, and storytelling to provide a perspective on these complex subjects, often viewed through the lens of Egyptian culture and identity. Al Tawil has a Bachelor of Arts (BA) degree from the Faculty of Applied Arts in Egypt. He acquired a Diploma of Fine Art from the Academy of Fine Arts (ADBK). Additionally, He studied Media Art Histories at the Danube University in Krems, Austria. Sameh has showcased his artwork in various exhibitions and events around the world, including "Kunst am boden" Exhibition for Endless Journey project(2003), "Ma'am / Grave" Dom Museum, Frankfurt for Just in Time(2003), Goethe-Institute Cairo for Kopf - Head (2004), Patricia Gruel in Uban Gallery for Visitors(2005), Fine art academy Hall, Munich, for No Way (2005), Architectural pheromones hall, Jeddah, KSA for SOLO Project(2006) stadtgalerie, Bern, Switzerland and Ithuba Gallery, Johannesburg, ZA. for VS Versa(2013), 5th Cairo Video festival and Afiriperfoma Fest., Zimbabwe for A442Hz project(2013), Diplom Exhibition 2014 for Clockwise, 18th Edition of ISAF Sharja, UAE for Door to Paradise 22nd Edition of ISAF Sharja, UAE exhibition for Ask Google, Cairotronica cairo and Nexus group Exhibition for Chaos He also won multiple award for his art and video installation which includes Youth Salon Award (1999, 2000, 2004), Cannes Lions Silver 2021, 2 Effie Awards 2017 & 2019, EME Award 2018, Comprix Award 2018, BestCss award, AdsOfTheWorld 2020, Vuforia Vision Award 2015. He got a commission from the Contemporary Art Museum in Munich for the SOLO project (2003). His most recognized work includes Ready to Go, Not for Sale and IDEMixer.
- Wael Shawky: Born in 1971 Alexandria, Wael Shawky studied at the University of Alexandria for his BFA, and then at the University of Pennsylvania for his MFA. His work has been showcased all over Europe and the United States, as well as in Egypt. He also took part in the Venice Biennale of 2003. One of the main themes tackled in his deliberately provocative work is what constitutes "normality" and "abnormality", whether in his installations, photography or performance. His work includes Digital Church (2007), The Cave (2006) and Al Aqsa Park (2006)

== Events, festivals and initiatives ==
- Artbeat Festival: Founded in 2010, Artbeat is a free 3-day annual festival combining visual art, music and various art workshops by local and international artists. The festival takes place today in Cairo, Alexandria, Mansoura and Minya.
- Di-Egy Festival 0.1: Launched in 2013, Di-Egy Festival 0.1 is the first digital art festival happening in Cairo. Combining exhibition and workshops, it aims to challenge artists and audiences on the question of how electronics have altered the art world, especially after the 25th of January revolution.
- Downtown Contemporary Arts Festival (D-CAF): Founded in 2012, this multi-disciplinary festival brings a wide range of independent visual art exhibitions, film screenings, theatre, dance, music and workshops to various venues across downtown Cairo. Gathering local, regional and international artists, the festival seeks to enshrine the place of art and culture in Egypt's evolving society.
- Hal Badeel (Alternative Solution) is a three-week festival founded in March 2013 and providing free of charge events, from music, theatre and dance to clown and mime performances. It has been created in reaction to the closing down of the Rawabet Theatre in Downtown Cairo and the lack of free, independent performance spaces for artists in Cairo.
- Mahatat Collective: Founded in 2011, Mahatat is a multi-disciplinary mobile art initiative whose goal is the accessibility and decentralization of contemporary art by the development of art in public space and community-based art projects all over Egypt.
- Cairotronica: was founded as the Cairo Electronic and New Media Arts Festival, which is a biannual festival established in 2016 that showcases emerging and established new media artists and offers transformational learning experiences.
- Something Else exhibition: A contemporary, non-profit independent visual arts initiative that attempts to support Egyptian and international contemporary art, an international art event consists of art exhibitions, art performances, films, diverse workshops, street art, talks and lectures by local as well as international artists and art connoisseurs that take place in diverse art and cultural spaces in Cairo.

== Education ==
- Academy of Arts
- American University in Cairo's Department of the Arts
- The Townhouse Gallery
- Cairo Contemporary Dance Center - first Contemporary Dance school in Africa and the Arab world

== See also ==
- The Townhouse Gallery
- Culture of Egypt
- Egyptian pavilion – the country's national pavilion at the Venice Biennale
- Darb 1718
- Arab culture
- List of Egyptians

== Bibliography ==
- Amirsadeghi Hossein, Mikdadi Salwa, Shabout Nada, New Vision: Arab Contemporary Art in the 21st Century, Thames and Hudson, 2009.
- Boraie Sherif, ed. Wall Talk: Graffiti of the Egyptian Revolution, Zeitouna, 2012.
- Eigner Saeb, Art of the Middle East: Modern and Contemporary Art of the Arab World and Iran, Merrell Publishers Ltd, 2010.
- Farjam Lisa, Unveiled: New Art from the Middle East, Booth-Clibborn Editions, 2009.
- Grondahl Mia, Revolution Graffiti. Street Art of the New Egypt, Thames & Hudson, 2013.
- Shabout Nada, Modern Arab Art: Formation of Arab Aesthetics, University Press of Florida, 2007.
- Sloman Paul, Contemporary Art in the Middle East: Artworld, Black Dog Publishing, 2009.
