= Egyptian Art =

Egyptian Art may refer to:

- The Art of ancient Egypt, c. 5000 BCE - c. 300 BCE
- Hellenistic art of Egypt, c. 300 BCE - c. 100 CE, during the Ptolemaic dynasty
- Coptic art c. 100 CE - present, see, e.g., Coptic iconography
- Islamic art of Egypt, c. 700 CE - present
- Contemporary art in Egypt
