= CCDC =

CCDC may stand for:

- The Cairo Contemporary Dance Center
- The Cambridge Crystallographic Data Centre
- Catoctin Creek Distilling Company, a distillery based Virginia, United States
- Chinatown Community Development Center in San Francisco, which also created the Adopt-An-Alleyway Youth Empowerment Project
- China Central Depository & Clearing Co., Ltd., based in Beijing, China
- Chinese Center for Disease Control and Prevention, based in Beijing, China
- City Contemporary Dance Company, a leading modern dance company in Hong Kong
- Collegiate Cyber Defense Competition, a series of defensive computer security contests in the United States
- Columbus County Detention Center, a Correctional Institution in North Carolina, also called Columbus Correctional Institution
- United States Army Combat Capabilities Development Command, headquartered at Aberdeen Proving Ground, Maryland
- Community College of the District of Columbia, located in Washington, D.C., United States
- United States Circuit Court of the District of Columbia, abbreviated C.C.D.C. in case citations
