= Egyptian pavilion =

Venice Biennale national pavilion

Coordinates: 45.4292°N 12.3601°E

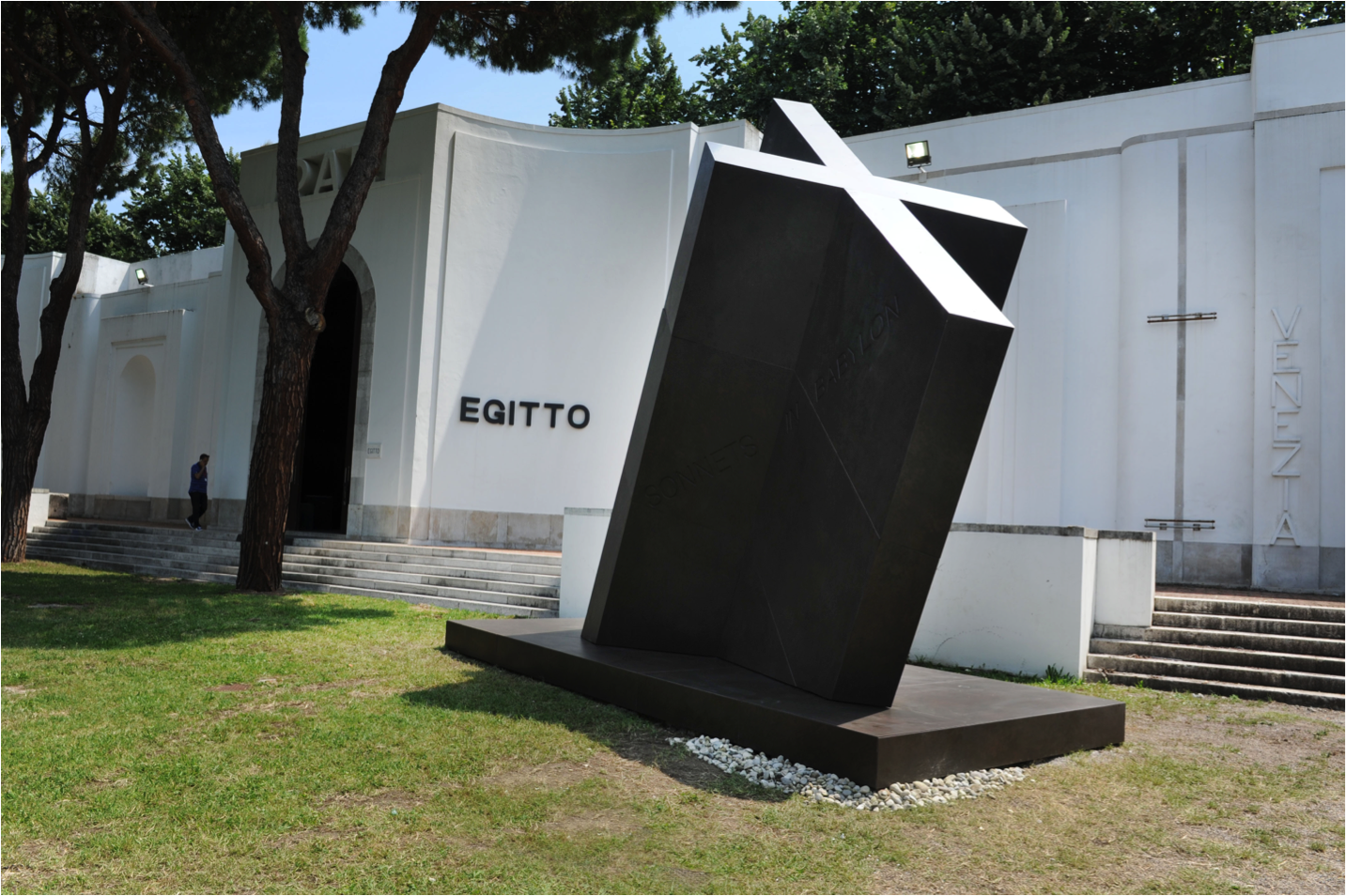
Sonnets in Babylon. Jardín de la Bienal de Venecia- Italia

The Egyptian pavilion is a national pavilion of the Venice Biennale. It houses Egypt's official representation during the Biennale. The building is part of a complex that Brenno Del Giudice designed in 1932 to house Venetian decorative arts on Sant'Elena Island – an expansion of the Biennale from its main Giardini area. The building later served as Switzerland's national pavilion before the country moved to a new pavilion in 1952 and left the building to Egypt. The national pavilions for Serbia and Venice flank the Egyptian pavilion. Egypt's 1995 exhibition won the Biennale's Golden Lion award for best national pavilion.

== Background ==
The Venice Biennale is an international art biennial exhibition held in Venice, Italy. Often described as "the Olympics of the art world", participation in the Biennale is a prestigious event for contemporary artists. The festival has become a constellation of shows: a central exhibition curated by that year's artistic director, national pavilions hosted by individual nations, and independent exhibitions held throughout Venice. The Biennale's parent organisation also runs regular festivals in other arts: architecture, dance, film, music and theatre.

Outside the central international exhibition, individual nations produce their own shows, known as pavilions, as their national representation. Nations that own their pavilion buildings – such as the 30 housed in the Giardini – are responsible for their own upkeep and construction costs as well. Nations without dedicated buildings create pavilions in venues throughout the city.

== Building ==
In 1932, the Italian architect Brenno Del Giudice designed a series of buildings on Sant'Elena as an expansion from the main Giardini area of the Venice Biennale. The island of Sant'Elena is separated from the Giardini by a bridged canal. The original complex was designed as a single unit to exhibit Venetian decorative arts. Its façade repeats a pattern of straight and curved features, including multiple arches in the recesses and openings of its façade. The complex was later split into two national pavilions flanking a central Venetian pavilion, of which Switzerland received the national pavilion on the left. When Switzerland moved to a new pavilion in 1952, Egypt moved into the Del Giudice building, where it remained as of 2013. The space consists of a rectangular room with two smaller rooms adjacent. The building's entrance extends outwards from its façade, similar to the visual style of the Venetian pavilion next door. The letters "RAE" are carved into the façade above the entrance archway, standing for "Repubblica Araba d'Egitto".

Del Giudice expanded the complex in 1938 to add pavilions on each side of the main structure. Sweden used the building to the left of the Egyptian pavilion, but the Nordic countries constructed their own pavilion between 1958 and 1962; Serbia then received Sweden's old pavilion. The Egyptian pavilion rests between the Serbian and Venetian pavilions.

== Exhibitions ==
Egypt and the United Arab Republic participated in the Venice Biennale since 1938.

=== 1995 ===
The 1995 exhibition of Akram El-Magdoub, Hamdi Attia, Medhat Shafik, and Khaled Shokry received the Biennale's Golden Lion award for best national pavilion.

=== 2004 ===
The Egyptian pavilion at the 9th Venice Biennale of Architecture (6th D) presented a unique experimental project created by three architects from Alexandria, Egypt. The installation explored the influence of information technology on architectural conception through the synchronisation of two distant spaces: the Salah Eldin Citadel in Cairo and the Egyptian pavilion in Venice. Through interactive media screens, the pavilion enabled real‑time interaction between inhabitants of both locations, creating the illusion of a unified space despite the geographical separation. This innovative approach responded to the Biennale's 'Metamorph' theme by challenging conventional spatial boundaries and demonstrating how architecture could transcend physical limitations to create shared experiences across continents. The project represented an early exploration of virtual connectivity in architectural discourse, effectively blurring the boundaries between physical presence and digital interaction.

General commissioner: Magdy M. Moussa. Teamwork: Ibrahim Abdelhady Ibrahim, Ahmed Hussein Ezzat, and Reham Hassan Mostafa. Communication support: Nezar Nabil Samy and Majid Mohammed Elsadek.

=== 2011 ===
Digital artist Ahmed Basiony was killed on the Friday of Anger at the start of the 2011 Egyptian revolution. His friend, the artist Shady El Noshokaty, nominated Basiony to represent Egypt at the 54th Venice Biennale in 2011. Only months after Basiony's death, Egypt's Ministry of Culture selected the project. The curator Aida Eltorie, together with El Noshokaty, showed one of Basiony's last works, 30 Days of Running in the Space, alongside documentary footage of the protests in Cairo that Basiony had shot during the last three days of his life. 30 Days, which Basiony first performed in January 2010, consisted of Basiony jogging in a plastic suit whose physiological sensors sent data wirelessly to a computer, which then visualised and projected the data onto a wall. His performance – one hour each day of the 30‑day show – was recorded.

The animated changes in the visualisation of 30 Days showed no observable correlation with Basiony's actions or state. One interpretation of the work posited that it represented the futility of aimless activity – meticulous yet pointless.

Basiony's death and the Biennale exhibition brought eminence to the field of new media art and encouraged Egyptian new media artists. A version of the Biennale show was presented at the American University in Cairo in October 2012 as part of a commemoration of Basiony. A simultaneous retrospective of his new media work was displayed at Darb 1718.

The Egyptian media artist Ahmed Bassiouny's exhibition at the 54th Venice Biennale in 2011 was openly polemical. Ahram Online described the 2011 exhibition as "renowned".

Ibraaz described the pavilion's 2013 exhibition of bronze, steel, and granite sculptures self-curated by Khaled Zaki was "laughable" in comparison to the previous year.

=== 2015 ===
In 2015, the three exhibitors won an Egyptian Ministry of Culture contest to represent Egypt in Venice. In 'Can You See', an installation featured looping astroturf surfaces replete with tablet computers, which showed insects, pests, butterflies, and bunnies in grassy pastures. The astroturfed surfaces were built in white medium density fiberboard and formed ramps, precipices, and entranceways. The structures could also resemble bridges. When viewed from above, the structure spelled the word 'PEACE' in both Latin and Arabic scripts, though visitors could not see this. The 'PEACE' logo was also pasted on the astroturf. Viewers could point the cameras of the several Samsung tablets on stands throughout the room towards these logos to show an augmented reality within the gallery. The screen showed plus and minus symbols, which viewers could press to change the serenity of the scene. Several presses of the plus symbol brought digital bunnies, butterflies, and flowers on‑screen, but several presses of the minus symbol brought cockroaches, tarantulas, and flames on‑screen. The three artists and the commissioner helped some visitors to use the software. The room was lit in a light grey light, and springtime ambient piped‑in music played in the background.

The Ministry of Culture selection committee was led by Helwan University fine arts dean El‑Sayed Qandil. Other committee members came from the art community and included artists, arts writers, and art academics. The committee chose three finalists from eleven graded submissions. The Supreme Council of Plastic Arts voted for the winner from the three finalists. The criteria by which the submissions were judged included: (1) teamwork, as the artists would represent Egypt together; (2) fit with the commissioner, who should have art and language experience; and (3) concept, which must match the themes of the Biennale, modernity, and the 'current direction of the country'. The three artists and the commissioner all held degrees from Helwan University's fine arts department and listed few other exhibitions in their curriculum vitae.

The project received mixed reviews both in Egypt and abroad for both its artistic content and the Ministry's selection process. Ahram Online reported that the installation revealed a growing divide between independent and state‑run projects in Egypt's art industry. Faten Mostafa of Cairo's Art Talks gallery thought that the concept was more "like an undergraduate project" than the standards of the Biennale. Shady El‑Noshokaty, a contemporary artist and co‑curator of the 2011 exhibition, claimed that the selection committee represented more traditional than contemporary arts, and that the result of the ministry selection process would reflect government priorities and 'artificiality'. The head of the selection committee defended its open call for participants. Another artist noted that some were upset about the selection even before the Biennale's opening. Alexander Forbes of Artsy wrote that the exhibition was "definitely the weirdest in the Giardini – and quite possibly in Venice at large". He felt conflicted between what he described as the project's 'visual cues of a ... lame corporate‑sponsored "art" show' and the exhibit's earnest advocacy to opt for peace in light of the country's recent revolution. His review, which described the tablet visual effects as 'cute' and the exhibition as 'cheesy' yet 'surprisingly moving', was widely shared on social media. Forbes thought that the 'amateurish nature' of the installation debased the high production values of the Biennale and considered whether the work was the Ministry's own meta‑commentary on the post‑revolution's record of repressing freedom of expression. Brian Droitcour of Art in America wrote that the installation's message of peace as a natural state was 'trite', and that in the atmosphere of the Biennale 'any throwback to a transcendent project comes off as hopelessly hokey'. He called the 'harmless wordplay and flashy gadgetry ... a safe choice for a bureaucracy aiming to promote quiescence' in the years following the 2011 Egyptian revolution. Alexandra Stock of Madr Masr wrote that the pavilion's aims were unclear, with inconsistent conceptual information between the exhibition's promotional materials, and that the tablet software was gimmicky and had issues with its programming. She wrote that the list of government agencies as curators of the exhibition was its 'most mysterious element'.

=== 2017 ===
Egyptian artist Moataz Nasr represented Egypt at the 57th Venice Biennale. His multi‑channel video installation, 'The Mountain', showed the life of a fictional Egyptian village over the course of a single day. The village's residents become suspicious as the video progresses, though the cause is concealed. Nasr wanted the video to express a poetic fearfulness. The video installation was buttressed by a background built from Egyptian dirt and bricks. Outside the pavilion, the Egyptian artist Hassan Khan won the Biennale's Silver Lion for a Promising Young Artist for his multi‑channel music and text piece designed for a public park.
