= Irhal =

Song by Ramy Essam
- Released: 2011
- Genre: chant

"Irhal" (إرحل) is a song by the Egyptian musician Ramy Essam, released in 2011. It was entirely composed by Ramy Essam and exhibits poetic lyrics which illustrate the public's frustration with the current political circumstances in Egypt. Its title is directly translated, in English, as "Leave", being that its message is aimed at expressing the youth's displeased attitude towards President Mubarak's dictatorial regime. "Irhal" famously became the anthem of the Egyptian protests in Tahrir Square. Many believe that Mubarak's resignation was much attributed to the popularity, and the strong message that spread, due to a YouTube post that instantly went viral after its release.

"Irhal" can be described as a chant, with simple acoustic guitar backing. The song itself is an aggregation of the most memorable and appealing chants Essam heard during his time camping out at Tahrir Square, and as such "Irhal" has been considered by some to be the musical embodiment of the 2011 Egyptian revolution.

== Societal impact ==
The ability of "Irhal" to give a unified voice to a desperate population is what made this number such a powerful catalyst for change. Essam rose to the forefront of the revolution due to this celebrated song. The melodic chant had become an anthem of the revolution. "Irhal, irhal" or "Leave, leave"; calling for Mubarak to step down.

== Repercussions ==
When Essam returned to the square, after Mubarak's historic announcement that he would be stepping down, the young musician was identified as an agitator, arrested and was in custody for four hours, during which time he was beaten and tasered.

== Accolades and recognition ==
"Irhal" was recognized by Time Out magazine, a London-based publishing company, in their 100 Songs That Changed History; placing "Irhal" third out of one hundred songs. Other songs include first-place winner, "Fight the Power" by Public Enemy and fifth-place winner, "Imagine", by John Lennon.

Due to his wild success, in 2011, Essam was able to travel to Britain, France, and Germany where he was booked to perform his protest music. He also has performed all over Egypt and done countless radio and television performances.
