= The Greatest Homeland =

1960 Pan-Arabist song

- Map of the current countries of the Arab world

Song by Abdel Halim Hafez Sabah (singer) Faida Kamel Shadia Nagat Warda
- Language: Arabic
- Published: 1958
- Released: 1960
- Genre: Egyptian Classical Music
- Length: 11:22
- Label: Cairophon; Soutelphan
- Composer: Mohammed Abdel Wahab
- Lyricist: Ahmed Shafik Kamel

Track listing

"The Greatest Homeland" (Arabic: الوطن الأكبر, romanized: l-waṭan l-akbar), known as the "Pan–Arabic patriotic anthem,", and by its romanized Arabic title, "Al Watan Al Akbar", was an Arab nationalist song composed in the United Arab Republic and recorded in Cairo. The song was sung by Abdel Halim Hafez, composed by Mohammed Abdel Wahab in 1960, and arranged by Egyptian composer Ali Ismael, with lyrics written by poet Ahmad Shafik Kamal.

The first version was initially released on Cairophon in 1958 and includes Huda Sultan instead of Warda.

The song praises the Arab territories as a single homeland, referring to different events, and exalting solidarity among Arabs.

== History ==
It was composed to celebrate the union of Egypt and Syria into the United Arab Republic. It also extolls the Pan-Arabist vision for a unified Arab state as also promoted by Gamal Abdel Nasser who backed the Voice of the Arabs, which broadcast nationalist and anti-colonial songs. His support led to extended broadcasting times, giving Egyptian musicians greater popularity across the Arab world, increasing the notability of pan-Arab music.

In January 1960, "Al-Watan Al-Akbar" premiered on the Voice of the Arabs radio station. It was aired live to celebrate the laying foundation of the Aswan High Dam.

The Egyptian Television Network, established in 21 July, 1960, carried on the pan-Arab music legacy from radio. ‘Al-Watan al-akbar’ also performed on national television in the newly founded Egyptian TV Orchestra. The performance, conducted by the composer, included an opening with visual presentations of Arab flags (pennons) being carried by men and women (as in a parade of nations) and a demonstration of unity sung in a mixed choir.

== Lyrics ==
Arabic

جوقة
وطني حبيبي
الوطن الاكبر
یوم ورا یوم
امجاده بتكبر
وانتصراته مالية حياته
وطني بيكبر وبيتحرر
وطني .. وطني

عبد الحليم حافظ:
وطني يا مالك حبك قلبي 𝄇
𝄆 وطني يا وطن الشعب العربي
يا اللي ناديت بالوحدة الكبرى
بعد ما شفت جمال الثورة
انت كبير
واكبر كتير
من الوجود كله
من الخلود كله
يا وطني

جوقة

صباح:
حلو يا مجد يا مالي قلوبنا 𝄇
𝄆 حلو يا نصر يا كاسي رايتنا
حلوة يا وحدة 𝄇
يا جامعه شعوبنا
𝄆 حلو يا احلى نغم في حياتنا
يا نغم ساري بين المحيطين
بين مراكش والبحرين
في اليمن ودمشق وجدة
نفس الغنوة لأجمل وحدة
وحدة كل الشعب العربي

جوقة

فايزه كامل:
قوميتنا اللي بنحميها 𝄇
𝄆 اللي حياتنا شموع حواليها
جنه بتضحك للي يسالم 𝄇
𝄆 وجحيم ساير على اعاديها
شوفوا بيروت بعد العدوان
الاستعمار فين والطغيان
قدر الشعب وقوته زادت
وبورسعيد حكايتها اتعادت
عاش وانتصر الشعب العربي

جوقة

شاديه:
وطني يا اغلى وطن في الدنيا 𝄇
𝄆 وطني يا قلعه للحرية
انت الباني مع البانيين 𝄇
𝄆 وانت الهادم للعبودية
الصوت صوتك حر وعربي
مش صدى شرقي ولا صدى غربي
ياللي ترابك كحل لعيني
ياللي هواك عطره بيحييني
انت حبيبي
يا وطني العربي

جوقة

وردۀ:
وطني يا ثوره على استعمارهم 𝄇
𝄆 املا جزايرك نار دمرهم
لو نستشهد كلنا فيك 𝄇
𝄆 صخر جبالنا راح يحاربهم
الاستعمار على ايدنا نهايته
راح م الدنيا زمانه ووقته
لا في الجزائر ولا في عمان
تهدا الثوره على الطغيان
الابنصر الشعب العربي

جوقة

نجاة الصغيرة:
وطني يا جنة الناس حاسدينها 𝄇
𝄆 على امجادها وعلى مفاتنها
ياللي قنالك رجعت ملكك 𝄇
𝄆 وانت لخير الدنيا صاينها
علي السد وخذ من خيره
صنع وازرع وابني بنوره
ياللي علاك في قلوبنا عبادة
يا وطن كل حياته سيادة
وطن العزة
الوطن العربي

جوقة

عبد الحليم حافظ:
وطني يا زاحف لانتصراتك 𝄇
𝄆 ياللي حياة المجد حياتك
في فلسطين وجنوبنا الثائر 𝄇
𝄆 حنكملك حرياتك
احنا وطن يحمي ولا يهدد
احنا وطن بيصون مايبدد
وطن المجد
يا وطني العربي

𝄆 جوقة 𝄇

Arabic in Latin Script

(ACA)

Gu2at:
Watani 7abibi
El-watan El-akbar
Yom wara yom
Amgadu btekbar
Wentasaratu maalia 7ayatu
Watani byekbar wa byet7arar
Watani...Watani

Abdel Halim Hafez:
𝄆 Watani ya malek 7obbak 2albi
Watani ya watan esh-sh3ab el3rabi 𝄇
Yelli nadeit bel-wa7de el-kubra
B3d ma shuft gamal es-sawra
Inta kabeer
Wakbar keteer
Min el-wagoud kullu
Min el-khaloud kullu
Ya watani

Gu2at

Saba7:
𝄆 7elwe ya magd ya maali 2lubna
7elwe ya nasr ya kasi rayetna 𝄇
𝄆 7elwe ya wa7de
Ya gam3a sh3ubna
Helwe ya a7la nagham fi 7ayatna 𝄇
Ya nagham saari beyn el-mo7iteyn
Beyn marakesh wel-ba7reyn
Fil yemen wel-dimishq wgeda
Nefs el-ghenwe lagmel wa7da
Wa7da kull esh-sh3ab el-3arabi

Gu2at

Fayza Kamel:
𝄆 2oumeyetna elli bina7miha
Elli 7ayatna shmu3 7owaleha 𝄇
𝄆 Gena bteD7ak lli yesaalem
W ga7im Saayer 3ala a3adiha 𝄇
Shufou beirut ba3d el-3dwan
El-ista3mar fein wet-Togheyan
2edr esh-sh3b wa 2ouwetu zadet
W borsa3id 7akayet-ha et3adet
3ash wentasaret esh-sh3ab El-3rabi

Gu2at

Shadia:
𝄆 Watani ya aghla watan feddunia
Watani ya 2al3a lel-7urreya 𝄇
𝄆 Enta elbani ma3 elbanieyn
Wenta el-hadm lel3boudeya 𝄇
Es-Sawt Sawtek 7urr w 3arabi
Mesh Sada shar2i wala Sada gharabi
Yelli trabek ka7l lel3ayni
Yelli hawak 3Tru bye7eeni
Enta 7abibi
Ya watani el-3arabi

Gu2at

Warda:
𝄆 Watani ya sawra 3la est3marhum
Emla jazeerak naar dmurhum 𝄇
𝄆 Law nestash-hed kullna feek
Sakher jbalna ra7 ye7arib-hum 𝄇
El-est3amar 3la idna nahayt-hu
Ra7 meddunia zamanu wa2tu
Laa fel-jazayer wala fi 3uman
Tehda es-sawra 3la et-Togheyan
Illa bnaSr esh-sh3ab el-3rabi

Gu2at

Nejat Al-Saghira:
𝄆 Watani ya gena en-nas 7asdenha
3la emgad-ha w 3la mafaten-ha 𝄇
𝄆 Yelli 2analak rej3et melkek
Wenta lekhair eddunia Sayen-ha 𝄇
3lay es-sed w khud men kheiru
Sana3 wa zara3 webna3 bnooru
Yelli 3alak fi 2ilubna 3abada
Ya watan kulli 7ayatu seyaada
Watan el3zeh
El-watan el-3arabi

Gu2at

Abdel Halim Hafez:
𝄆 Watani ya za7ef lenta9aratek
Yelli 7ayatel-magd 7ayatek 𝄇
𝄆 Fi Falasteen w genoubna es-sa2er
7ankamelek 7urriyetek 𝄇
E7na watan ye7mi wala yhadded
E7na watan byeSoun mayebadded
Watan el-magd
Ya watani el-3rabi

𝄆 Gu2at 𝄇

Romanization

Guqat:
Waṭani ḥabībī
Al-waṭan al-akbar
Yūm wara yūm
Amgāduh b-tikbar
W-intaṣarātu māliya ḥayātu
Waṭani bīkbar wa-bītḥarar
Waṭani... waṭani

ʿAbd al-Ḥalim Ḥafiẓ:
𝄆 Waṭani, yā mālik ḥubbak qalbi
Waṭani, yā waṭan ish-shaʿab al-ʿarabi 𝄇
Yillī nadīt b'il-waḥda l-kubra
Baʿadi mā shufti gamal eth-thawra
Inta kabīr!
W'akbar kitīr
Min il-wagūd kullu
Min il-khulūd kullu,
Yā... waṭani...

Guqat

Ṣabaḥ:
𝄆 Ḥelwe ya magd ya maali qlubna
Ḥelwe ya nasr ya kasi rayetna 𝄇
𝄆 Ḥelwe ya waḥde
Ya gam'u shu'ubna
Helwe ya aḥla nagham fi ḥayatna 𝄇
Ya nagham saari beyn el-moḥiteyn
Beyn marakesh wel-baḥreyn
Fil yemen wel-dimishq wgeda
Nefs el-ghenwe lagmel waḥda
Waḥda kull esh-sha'ab el-'arabi

Guqat

Fayza Kamel:
𝄆 Qoumeyetna elli binaḥmiha
Elli ḥayatna shmu' ḥowaleha 𝄇
𝄆 Gena btesḥak lli yesaalem
W gaḥim Saayer 'ala a'adiha 𝄇
Shufou beirut ba'ad el-'adwan
El-ista'amar fein wet-Togheyan
Qedr esh-sha'ab wa qouwetu zadet
W borsa'id ḥakayet-ha eta'adet
'Ash wentasaret esh-sha'ab El-'arabi

Guqat

Shadia:
𝄆 Watani ya aghla watan feddunia
Watani ya 'ala'a lel-ḥurreya 𝄇
𝄆 Enta elbani ma' elbanieyn
Wenta el-hadm lela'aboudeya 𝄇
Es-Sawt Sawtek ḥurr w 'arabi
Mesh Sada sharqi wala Sada gharabi
Yelli trabek kaḥl lela'ayni
Yelli hawak a'atru byeḥeeni
Enta ḥabibi
Ya watani el-3arabi

Guqat

Warda:
𝄆 Watani ya sawra 'ala esta'amarhum
Emla gazeerak naar dmurhum 𝄇
𝄆 Law nestash-hed kullna feek
Sakher jbalna raḥ yeḥarib-hum 𝄇
El-esta'amar 'ala idna nahayt-hu
Raḥ meddunia zamanu waqtu
Laa fel-gazayer wala fi 'oman
Tehda es-sawra 'ala et-Togheyan
Illa bnasr esh-sha'ab el-'arabi

Guqat

Nejat Al-Saghira
𝄆 Watani ya gena en-nas ḥasdenha
'Ala emgad-ha w 'ala mafaten-ha 𝄇
𝄆 Yelli qanalak rege'et melkek
Wenta lekhair eddunia Sayen-ha 𝄇
'Alay es-sed w khud men kheiru
Sana'a wa zara'a webna'a bnooru
Yelli 'alak fi qilubna 'abada
Ya watan kulli ḥayatu seyaada
Watan ela'izeh
El-watan el-'arabi

Guqat

ʿAbd al-Ḥalim Ḥafiẓ:'
𝄆 Watani ya zaḥef lenta9aratek
Yelli ḥayate l-magde ḥayatek 𝄇
𝄆 Fi Falasteen w genoubna es-saqer
Ḥankamelek ḥurriyetek 𝄇
Eḥna watan yeḥmi wala yhadded
Eḥna watan byesoun mayebadded
Watan el-magdi
Ya watani el-'arabi

𝄆 Guqat 𝄇

English

Chorus:
My dear homeland
The greatest of homelands
Day after day
Its glories multiply
And its life is rife with victories
My homeland grows and becomes free
My homeland...My homeland

Abdel Halim Hafez:
𝄆 Oh my homeland, your love rules my heart
My homeland, the homeland of all Arabic people 𝄇
You are the one who called for the ultimate unity
After seeing the beauty of the revolution
You are great
And much greater
Than all existence
Than all eternity
Oh, my homeland

Chorus

Sabah:
𝄆 Sweet is the glory filling our hearts
Sweet is the victory cladding our flag 𝄇
𝄆 Sweet is the unity
That brings our people together
It is the sweetest melody in our lives 𝄇
Oh, It's a melody flowing between two oceans
Between Marrakesh and Bahrain
In Yemen, Damascus and Jeddah
there's the same song of the most beautiful unity
The unity of all Arab people

Chorus

Fayza Kamel:
𝄆 Our national unity that we are protecting
The one that our lives light as candles around it, 𝄇
𝄆 is a paradise smiling upon whoever is peaceful
And a hell unleashed upon its enemies 𝄇
Go see Beirut after the attacks
Where is the occupation and oppression?
The people became abler and their power increased
And the story of Port Said repeated itself
The Arab nations lived and were victorious

Chorus

Shadya:
𝄆 Oh my homeland, the most precious homeland in the world
My homeland, you are a castle of freedom 𝄇
𝄆 You are the one that builds with those who build
And the one that tears down oppression 𝄇
Your voice is free and Arabic
with no Eastern nor Western echos
Your dirt is fit to be eyeliner for my eyes
The fragrance of your air is my rebirth
You are my love
Oh, my Arabic homeland

Chorus

Warda:
𝄆 Oh my homeland, you are a revolution against their occupation
Fill your islands with fire, destroy them 𝄇
𝄆 If we are all martyred upon your lands
The rocks of our mountains will fight them 𝄇
Occupation will end by our hands
Its time in this world is up and done
Not in Algeria, Not in Oman,
Will the revolution fade in the face of oppression
until the triumph of the Arabic people.

Chorus

Najat Al Saghira:
𝄆 Oh, my homeland, you are a paradise that people envy
For its glories and charms 𝄇
𝄆 Your canal returned to you
And you are protecting it for the good of the world 𝄇
Raise the dam up high and reap its goods
Produce, plant and build with its light
Your elevation is worship in our heart
You are a homeland whose life is full of sovereignty
The homeland of dignity
The Arabic homeland

Chorus

Abdel Halim Hafez:
𝄆 Oh my homeland, you crawl towards your victories
Your life is a life of glory 𝄇
𝄆 In Palestine and our revolting South,
We will regain your freedom 𝄇
We are a homeland that protects and does not threaten
A homeland that preserves and does not waste
A homeland of glory
My Arabic homeland

𝄆 Chorus 𝄇

== See also ==
- Contemporary art in Egypt § Political songs and music
