= Mahmoud Mokhtar =

Egyptian sculptor (1891–1934)

- محمود مختار
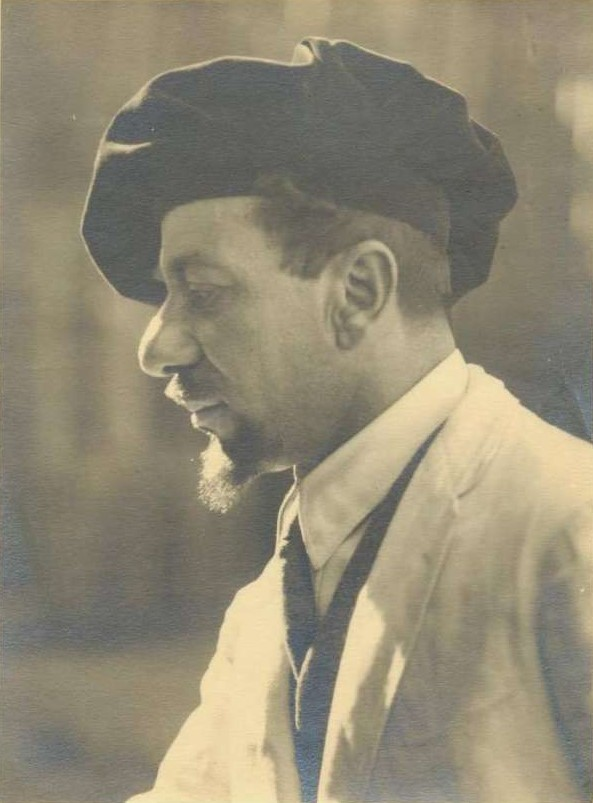
- Mokhtar, c. 1920s
- Born: 10 May 1891
- Died: 28 March 1934 (aged 42)
- Education: École des Beaux-Arts
- Known for: Sculpture
- Notable work: Egypt's Renaissance

Mahmoud Mukhtar (Arabic: محمود مختار) (May 10, 1891 – March 28, 1934) was an Egyptian sculptor. He attended the College of Fine Arts in Cairo upon its opening in 1908 by Prince Yusuf Kamal, and was part of the original "Pioneers" of the Egyptian Art movement. Despite his early death, he greatly impacted the realization and formation of contemporary Egyptian art. His work is credited with signaling the beginning of the Egyptian modernist movement, and he is often referred to as the father of modern Egyptian sculpture.

== History ==
Born in the Nile Delta in a small village called Douar skouila, in the region of Mahalla al-Kubra, in the village of Tanbara, where his father was the mayor ('Omda). Mukhtar moved to Cairo as a child with his mother, and in 1908 joined the newly founded Egyptian School of Fine Arts.

In 1912, he joined the studio of Jules Coutan at the École des Beaux-Arts in Paris. He stayed in Paris through World War I, eventually becoming employed at the Musée Grévin under the direction of his former teacher Guillaume Laplagne. Inspired by the Egyptian Revolution of 1919, he sculpted a small maquette of a work called "Nahdat Misr" ["Egypt's Awakening" or "Egypt's Renaissance" in English]. Gaining attention of young Egyptian revolutionaries, a national campaign to erect a monumental version was begun, resulting in an unveiling ceremony of the work in Cairo's Bab al-Hadid Square outside Cairo's main train station. The statue was later moved to a location outside Cairo University.

The Mukhtar Museum in Cairo houses Mahmoud Mokhtar's works in various media. A Google Doodle on 10 May 2012 commemorated Mokhtar's 121st birth anniversary.

== Style and themes ==
Mokhtar's sculpture combined modern academic training with Egyptian subjects and references to ancient Egyptian art. His rural upbringing in the Nile Delta has been linked to his recurring interest in peasants, animals, and village life. In works such as Nahdat Misr and On the Banks of the Nile, he used the figure of the Egyptian peasant woman to express themes of nationalism, authenticity, and the relationship between Egypt and the Nile.

== Works ==
Mokhtar's best-known work is Nahdat Misr (Egypt's Awakening), which he first produced as a model in 1920. After a fundraising campaign, the monumental version was unveiled in Bab el-Hadid Square, now Ramses Square, in Cairo in 1928, and was later moved to the grounds of Cairo University in 1955. Other works by Mokhtar include Khamasin, a sculpture of a peasant woman walking into a sandstorm, as well as works depicting Egyptian rural and nationalist themes.

== Selected works ==
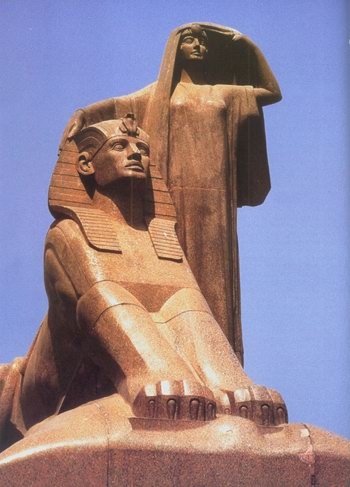
Egypt's Renaissance

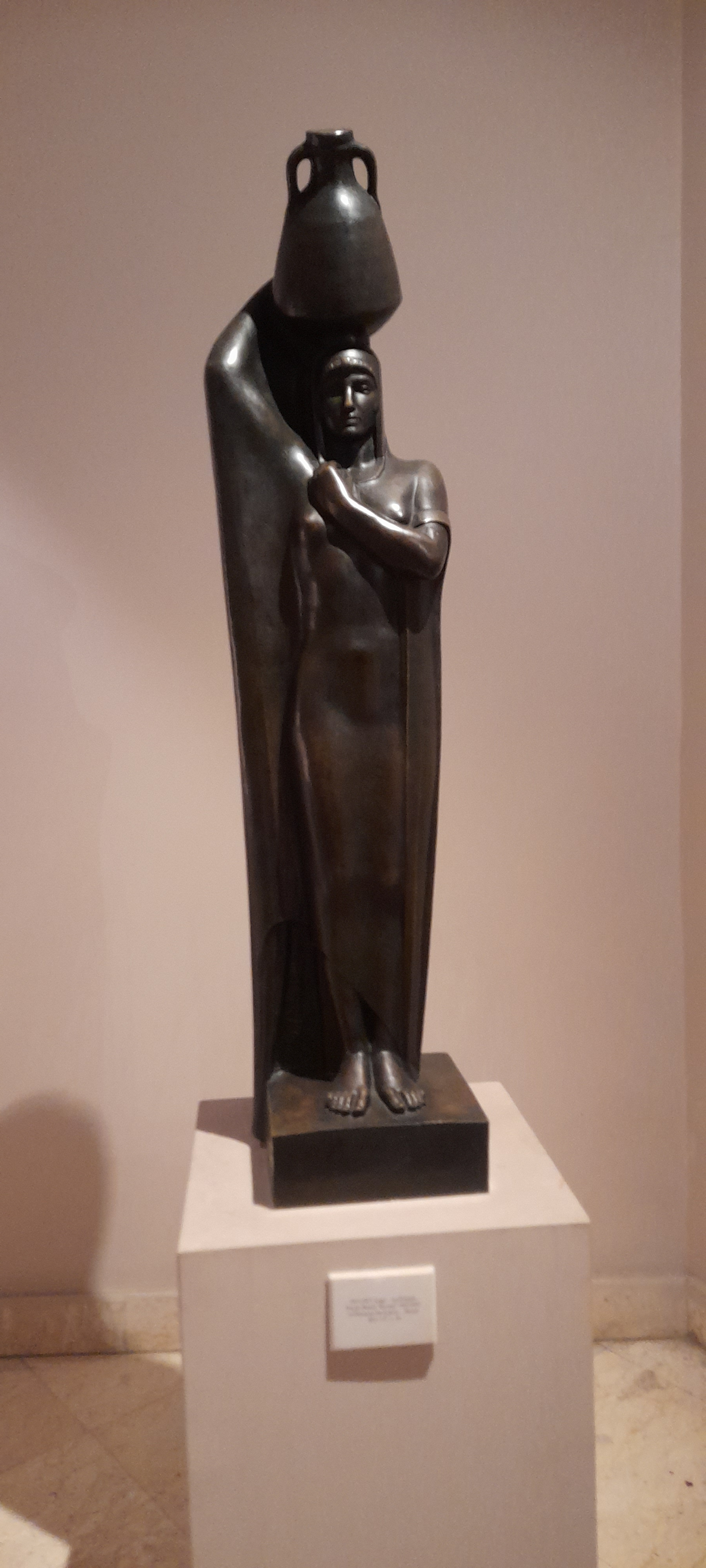
Sculpture displayed at the Mahmoud Mokhtar Museum

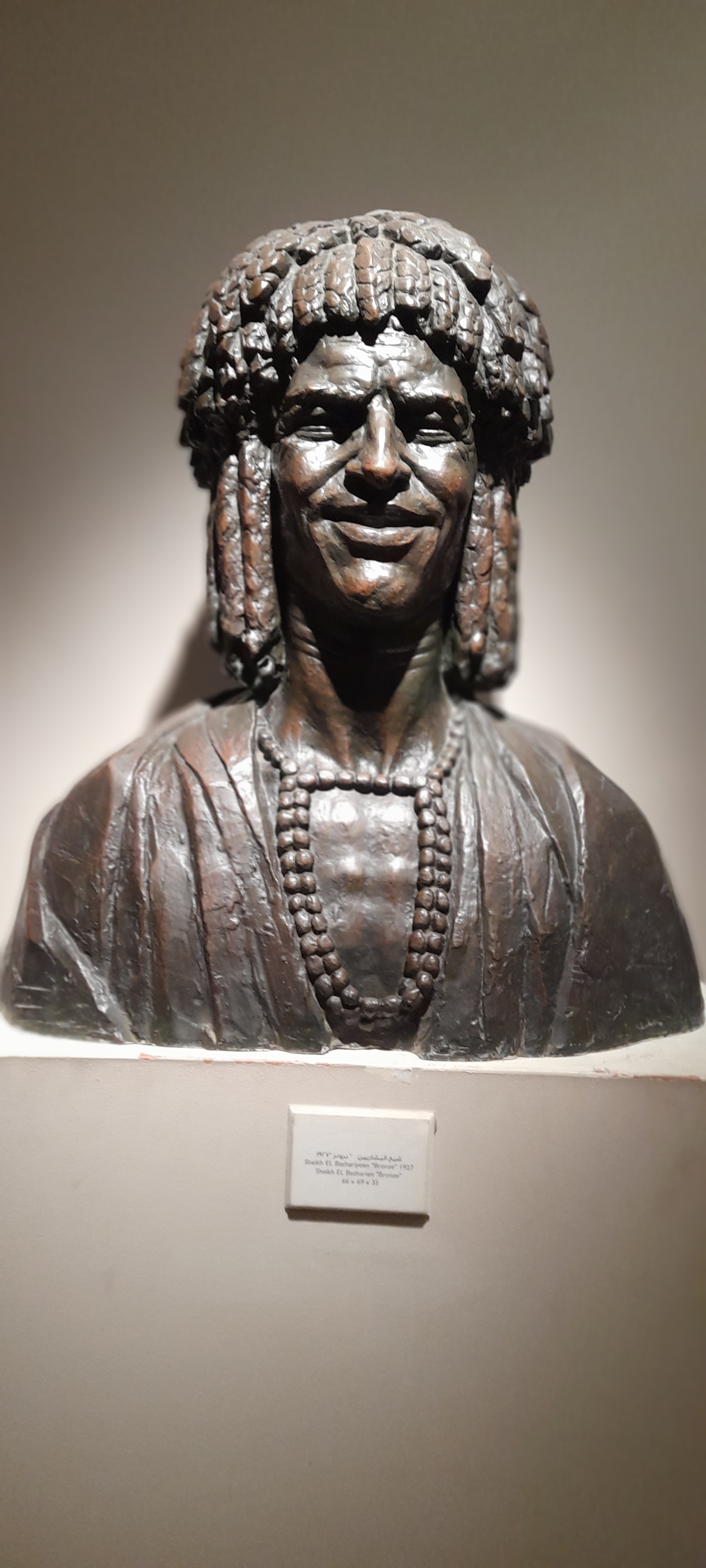
Bust displayed at the Mahmoud Mokhtar Museum

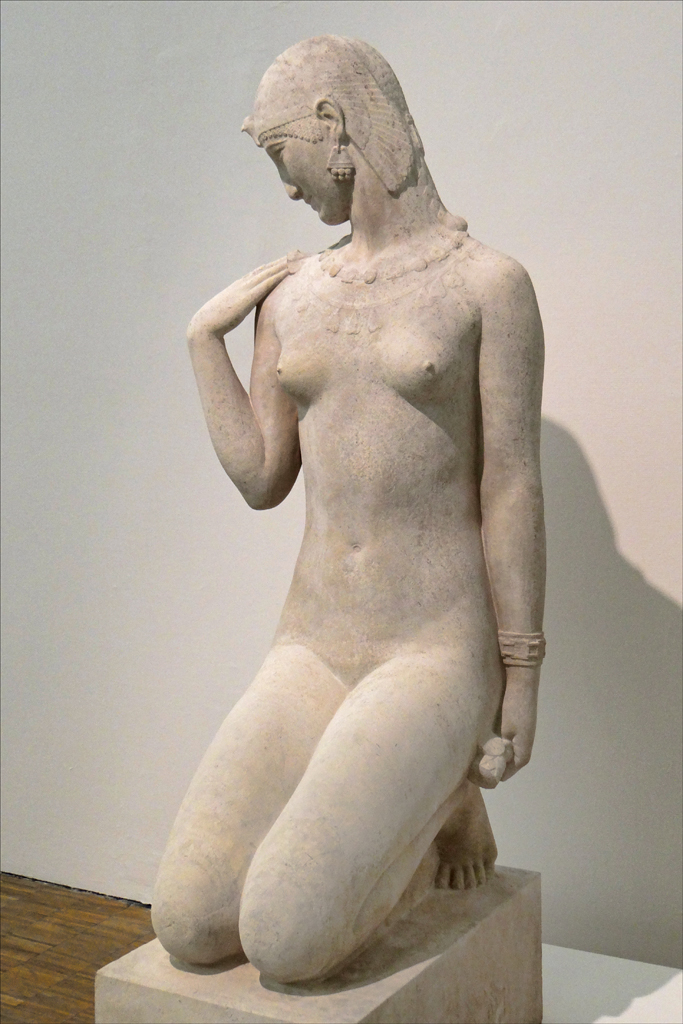
The Bride of the Nile
