= El Shaab =

"El Shaab" (Arabic: الشعب "The People") is a 2012 installation piece by the Egyptian artist Moataz Nasr composed of 25 painted ceramic figures representing participants in the 2011 Egyptian revolution. The figures are 27 x 6 x 10 cm each, arranged on two shelves. As of 2022, the piece is part of the Barjeel Art Foundation's collection.

== Name ==
The title alludes to the dominant chant of the Arab Spring: ash-shaʻb yurīd isqāṭ an-niẓām (الشعب يريد إسقاط النظام " the people want to bring down the regime").

== Description ==
The clay figurines, arranged in clusters on two shelves, symbolize the diversity of the people who assembled in Tahrir Square to demand the end of tyrannical government as well as bread (life), freedom, human dignity, and social justice. Some figures are depicted bearing wounds sustained in the revolution. On a separate shelf, the violence captured in the viral video of police attacking The Girl in the Blue Bra is recreated with painted porcelain figures. Her limp body, dragged and stomped on by the three officers of the Egyptian Supreme Council of the Armed Forces, lies on the ground, surrounded by her torn-off abaya.

El Shaab was first displayed in 2012, the year following the eruption of the revolution and the year of Egypt's first democratic presidential election.

The piece was part of the exhibition entitled "No to the Invasion: Breakdowns and Side Effects" curated by Fawz Kabra.
