= Mukhtar Museum =

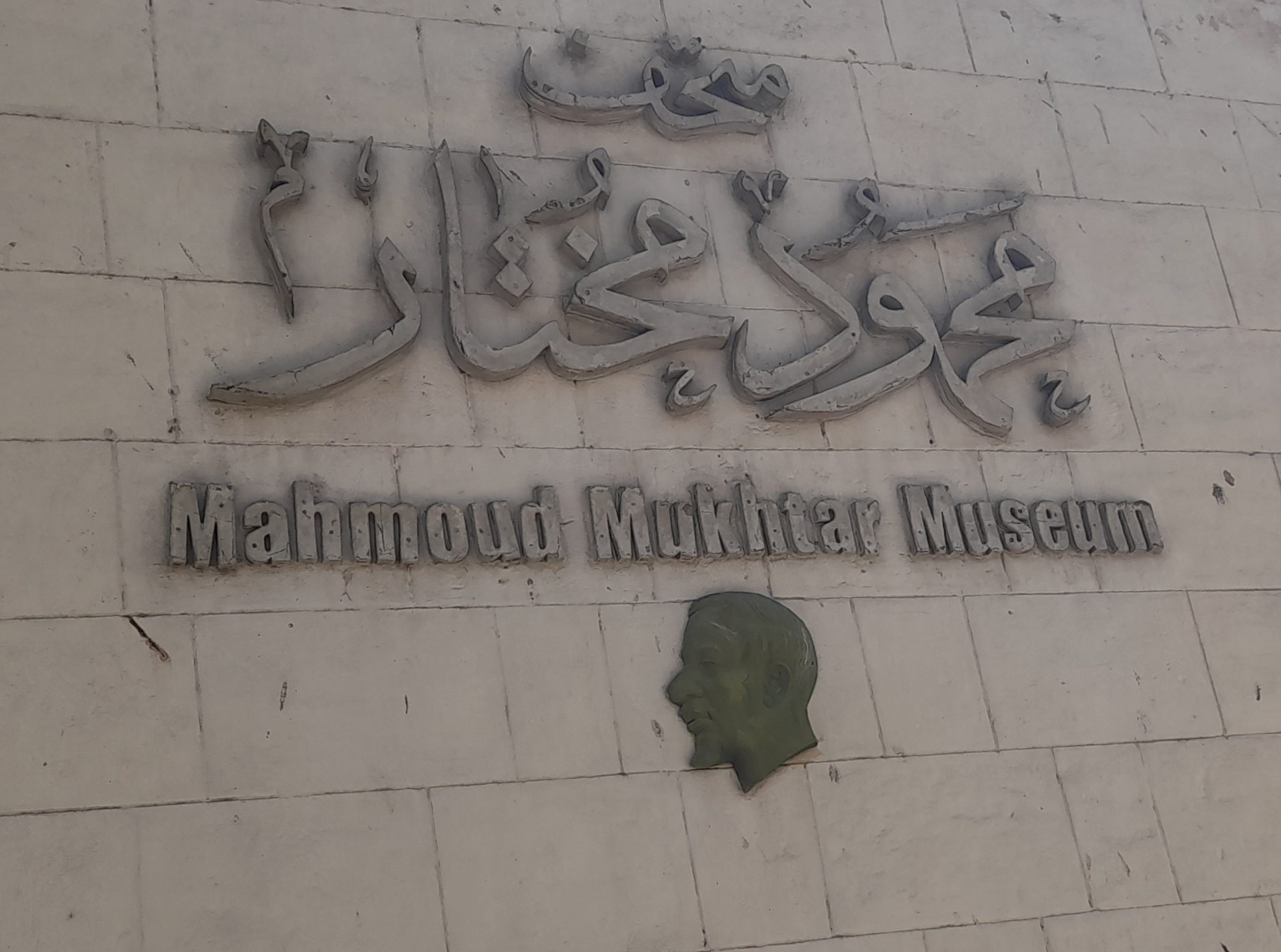
- Mukhtar Museum
- Location: Cairo, Egypt
- Coordinates: 30.0405°N 31.2229°E
- Type: museum
- Key holdings: Mahmoud Mokhtar works
- Collections: Egyptian art

Architectural plan of the museum by Hassan Fathy

Mukhtar Museum is a museum in Cairo, Egypt, housing the sculptures of Mahmoud Mokhtar (May 10, 1891 – March 28, 1934). Mokhtar is considered to be significant as the father of modern Egyptian sculpture. His tomb is in the basement of the museum.

== History and collection ==
The Mahmoud Mukhtar Museum was opened on 24 July 1962. The building was designed by Ramses Wissa Wassef and houses eighty-five works by Mahmoud Mokhtar, made from bronze, stone, basalt, marble, granite and plaster.

The museum is located in El Horreya Park on Gezira Island, opposite the Cairo Opera House.

The museum has two floors with eight rooms of exhibits. One room is dedicated to Saad Zaghloul.

== Gallery ==
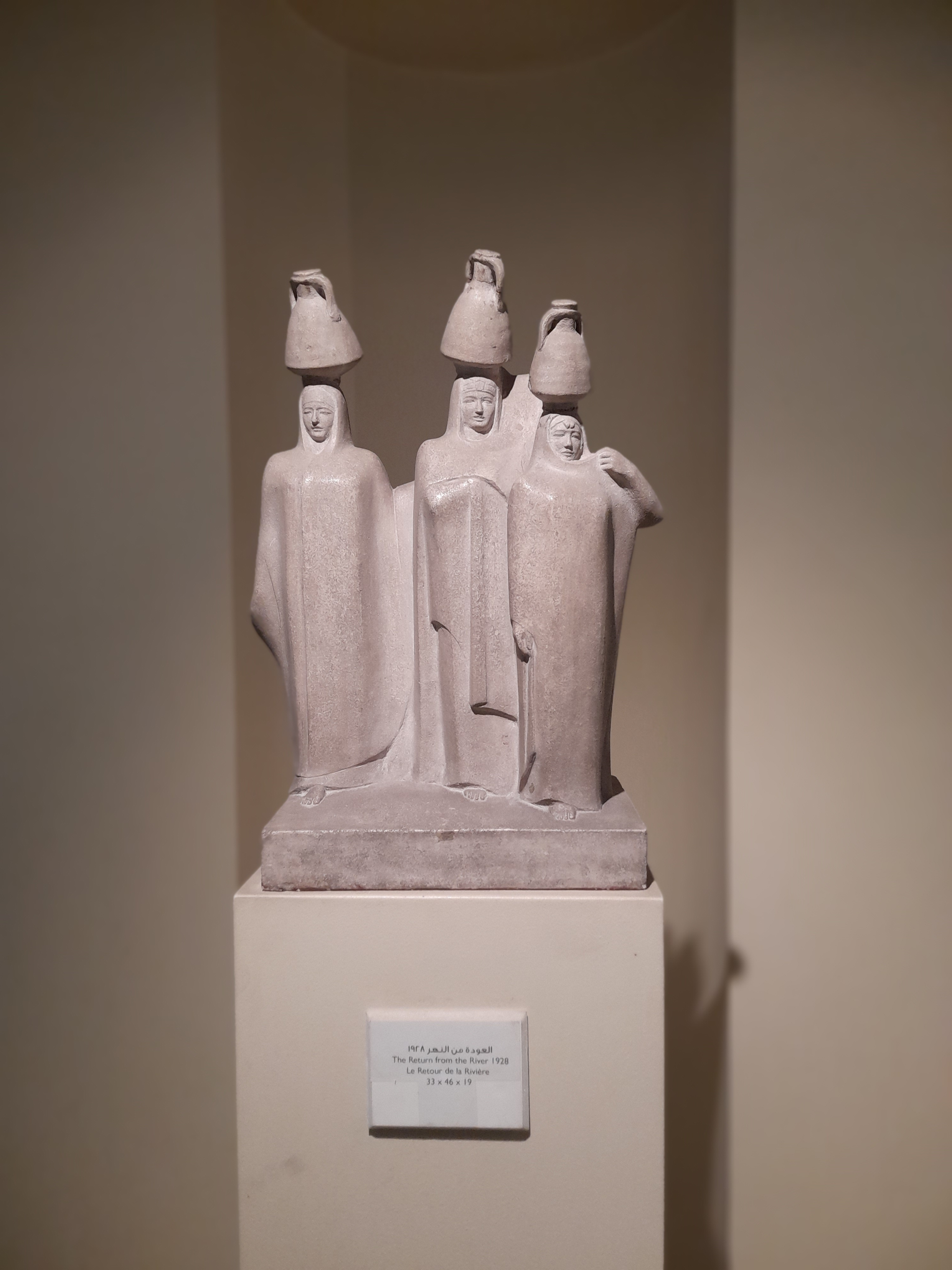

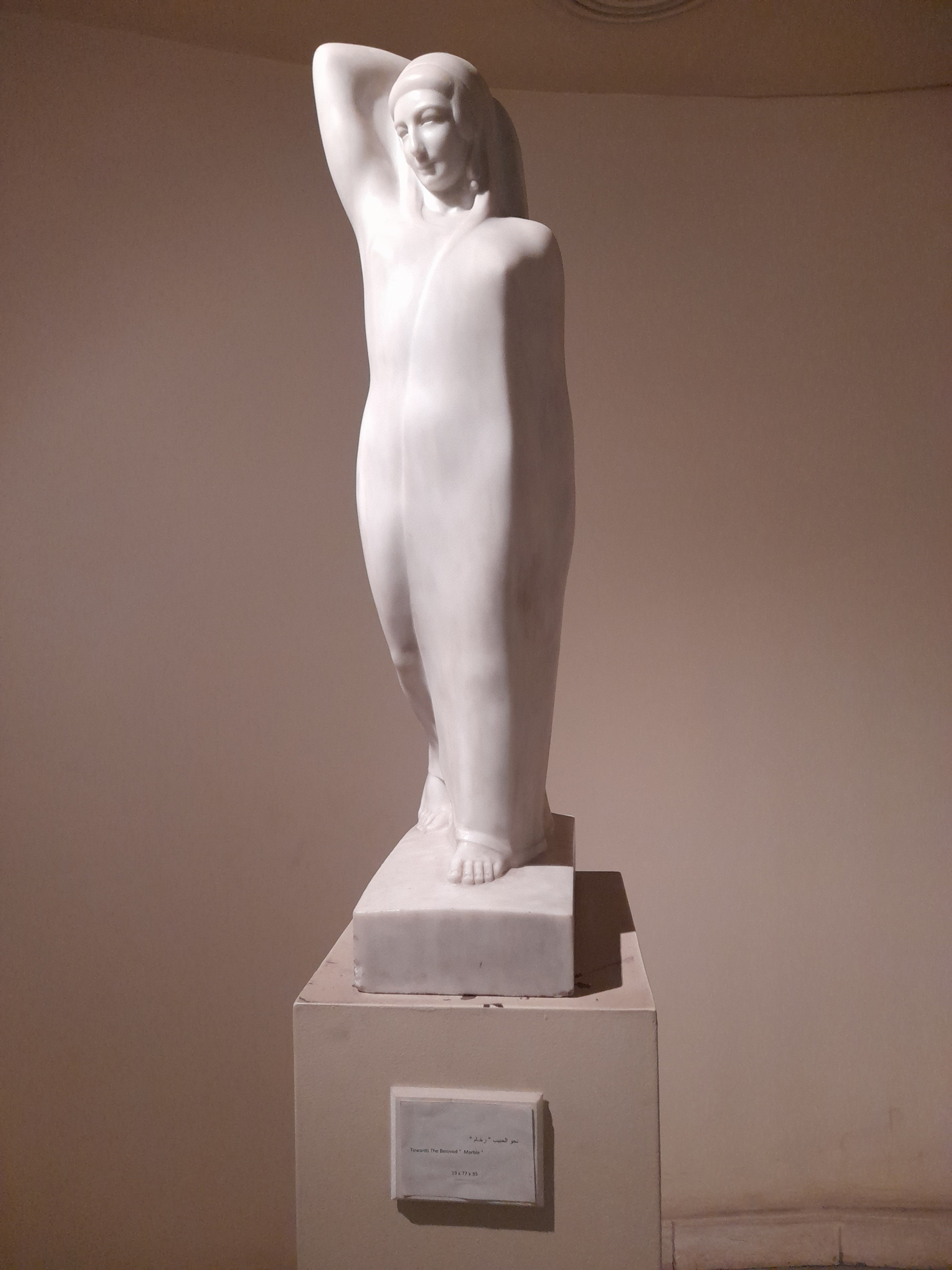

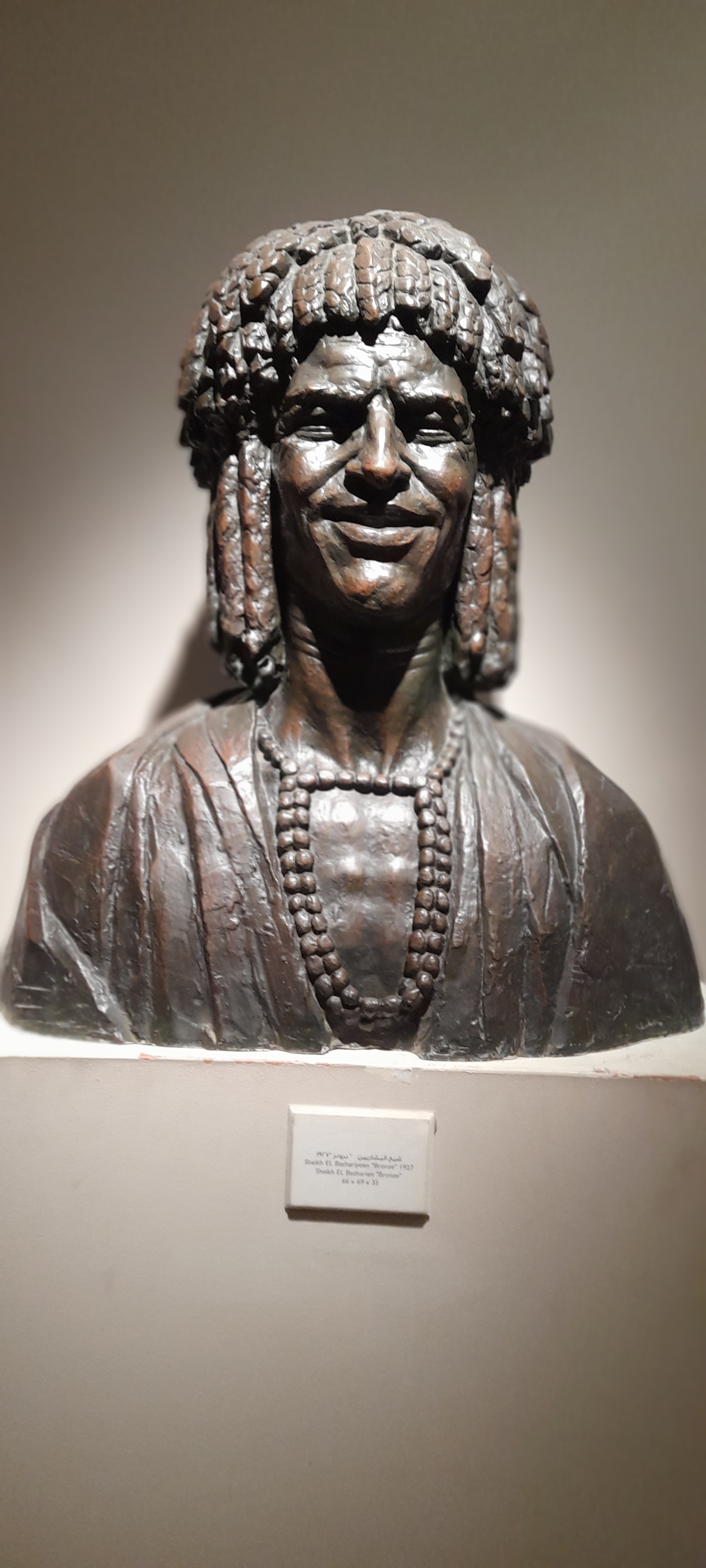

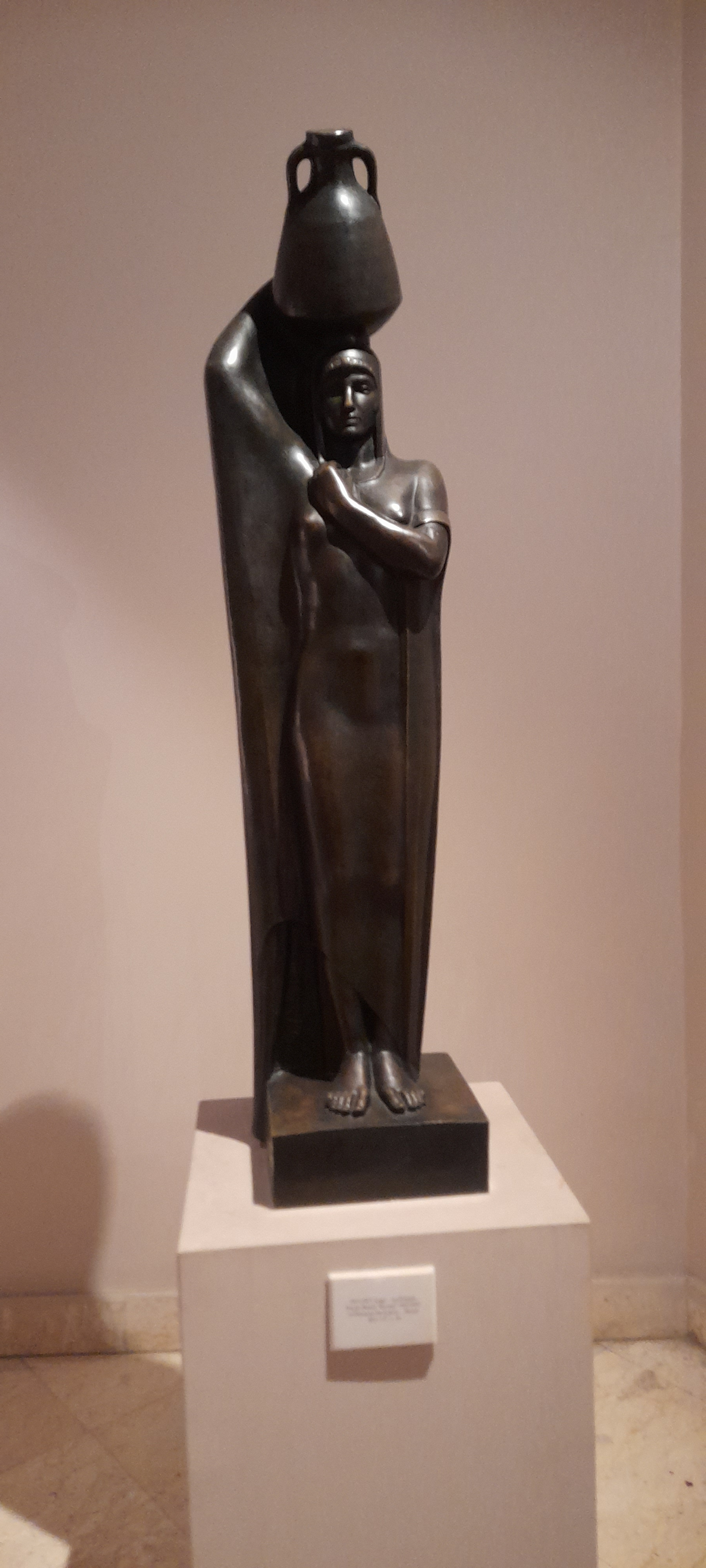

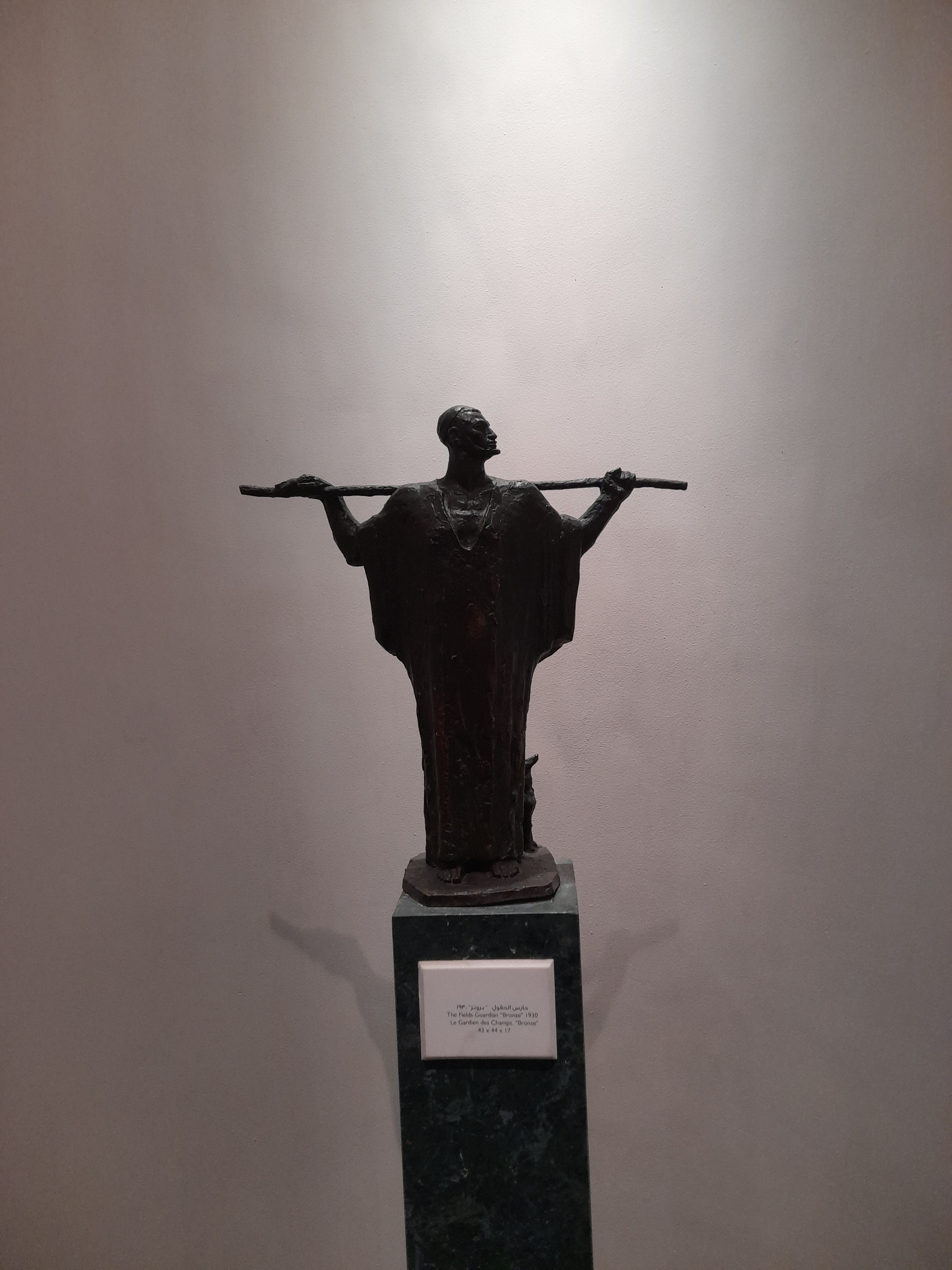
