= Galal El-Behairy =

Poet and songwriter (born 1990)

- Born: 27 June 1990
- Occupation: Poet

Galal El-Behairy (born 27 June 1990) is an Egyptian poet, songwriter, and political prisoner. Two collections of his poetry have been published: Masna'a El Karasy (The Chair Factory, 2015) and Segn Bel Alwan (Colorful Prison, 2017).

El-Behairy's lyrics often have been used in songs by exiled Egyptian musician Ramy Essam. El-Behairy was arrested on 5 March 2018 following the release of Essam's song "Balaha" on 26 February 2018. On 31 July 2018, El-Behairy was sentenced to three years in prison in connection with his unpublished poetry collection, The Finest Women on Earth. Despite having served the full three-year term to which he was originally sentenced, El-Behairy remains in prison more than seven years later.

International human rights organizations such as the United Nations Human Rights Council, PEN International and PEN America consider El-Behairy to be imprisoned for the peaceful exercise of the right to freedom of expression. They have called for his release and expressed concern about his health and safety. In 2025, Galal El-Behairy was awarded the PEN/Barbey Freedom to Write award by PEN America. The award was accepted on his behalf by his father Abdelfattah Galal and sister Naiera Galal.

== Career ==
El-Behairy has written three collections of poetry: Masna'a El Karasy (The Chair Factory, 2015), Segn Bel Alwan (Colorful Prison, 2017) and The Finest Women on Earth (unpublished as of 2018.)

External videos
- “Segn Bel Alwan”, performed by Ramy Essam and Lebanese rapper Malikah

Galal El-Behairy's lyrics are used in a number of songs by the exiled Egyptian musician Ramy Essam. Essam was referred to as a "Voice of the Revolution" for his involvement in the 2011 Egyptian revolution during the Arab Spring. "Segn Bel Alwan" ("Colorful Prison"), the title poem of El-Behairy's second poetry collection, is the basis for Essam's hit song of the same name. "Segn Bel Alwan" recognizes women for their resistance to oppression in Egypt and worldwide.

== Imprisonment ==
On 26 February 2018, Ramy Essam released the song "Balaha", which contains lyrics written by Galal El-Behairy. The title is a derogatory term, literally translated as "date", which is used for Egyptian President Abdel Fattah el-Sisi. The song satirizes Egypt's military rulers for political corruption and the state of Egypt's economy. As of 18 October 2023, the song's YouTube video had received more than 7 million views.

At least seven people were subsequently arrested due to supposed connections to Essam and the song "Balaha". Most were later released. The video's director, Shady Habash, died on 1 May 2020 after being held for two years in pretrial detention in Tora prison in Cairo. Habash's death was reportedly due to alcohol poisoning from drinking hand sanitizer.

On 28 February 2018, two days after the release of "Balaha", Egyptian Minister of Culture Enas Abdel Dayem publicly denounced Galal El-Behairy on live television, referencing his poetry collection The Finest Women on Earth. Despite having already printed the first edition, the book's publisher, Dar Da'ad Publishing and Distribution, terminated their contract with El-Behairy and the copies of the book were not released.

El-Behairy was arrested at Cairo International Airport on either 3 March 2018, or 5 March 2018. His whereabouts were unknown until 10 March 2018, when he appeared before the High State Security Prosecution. It appeared that he had been tortured during his enforced disappearance. Initial charges in Civilian Court were related to the song "Balaha", but this prosecution was later dropped.

El-Behairy was subsequently charged in the Egyptian Military Court in Cairo, a tactic that has been increasingly used in Egypt in violation of due process. The charges in military court related to his unpublished poetry collection, The Finest Women on Earth. It was claimed that the title was intended as an insult to soldiers, which El-Behairy has denied. Rather, he has stated that the title was "a recognition of the value of women and of their good deeds in this world". El-Behairy faced multiple charges including "spreading false news and rumors" and "insulting the Egyptian army". He appeared in court on May 6, 2018, but sentencing was repeatedly postponed. On 31 July 2018, he was sentenced to three years on prison and a fine of 10,000 Egyptian pounds. The fine was later overturned.

When the three year sentence ended in 2021, El-Behairy was forcibly disappeared for three weeks before being brought before the Supreme State Security Prosecution to again be charged. However, he has not been tried on new charges. As of 5 September 2023, he reached the maximum legal allowable time for being held in pretrial detention (two years), without being either tried or released. The practices of enforced disappearance, torture, long periods in pretrial detention, and the “recycling" of prisoners through repeated cases and additional charges, are human rights abuses frequently used in Egypt.

El-Behairy remains in prison in Cairo despite having served his full sentence, and exceeded Egypt's legal limits for pretrial detention. On the fifth anniversary of his detention, 5 March 2023, El-Behairy started a hunger strike in protest. He continued this hunger strike until 4 June 2023, stopping due to ill health. He resumed his hunger strike on 5 September 2023, and made a suicide attempt on 9 September 2023.

International human rights organizations such as the United Nations Human Rights Council, PEN International, and PEN America have called for El-Behairy's release and expressed concern about his health and safety.

== Awards and honors ==
- 2025: PEN/Barbey Freedom to Write award, PEN America
