= Shady Habash =

Egyptian filmmaker (1995–2020)

- Born: 21 August 1995; Egypt
- Died: 1 May 2020 (aged 24); Tora Prison, Cairo, Egypt
- Occupation: Filmmaker

Shady Habash (21 August 1995 – 1 May 2020) was an Egyptian filmmaker.

== Biography ==
Habash started a photography and video business in 2006. He was imprisoned without trial in March 2018 for making a music video for the exiled Egyptian rock musician Ramy Essam, that mocked Egyptian President Abdel Fattah el-Sisi. The video's release prompted the arrest of eight people, who were accused of "joining a terrorist group," "spreading false news," "abusing social media networks," "blasphemy," "contempt of religion," and "insulting the military" (Case No. 480 / 2018). As of 3 May 2020, the video had more than five million views on YouTube.

After being incarcerated for more than two years in pretrial detention, Habash died in Tora Prison in Cairo in May 2020 at the age of 24. Prosecutors stated that Habash's cause of death was officially ruled as alcohol poisoning in an autopsy, with the prosecutor-general further elaborating that Habash had mistakenly drunk alcohol-based hand sanitizer; according to the prosecutor-general, Habash died before he could be hospitalized.

== Legacy ==
On October 26, 2019, Habash sent out a letter from Tora prison. After Habash' death, Ramy Essam released a song using the content of this, Habash' last letter.

John Greyson's 2021 experimental short documentary film International Dawn Chorus Day was created as a tribute to Habash and Sarah Hegazi.
