= Moataz Nasr =

Moataz Nasr is an Egyptian painter, sculptor, multimedia artist and cultural activist.

== Biography ==
Nasr was born in Alexandria in August 1961. His father believed that art was not a profession, merely a hobby, so Nasr found himself studying economics at the University of Alexandria. Nasr's first entry into the Egyptian art scene happened in 1995 when he entered his work in a competition organized by the Egyptian Ministry of Culture and received third prize. However, he was criticized by fellow artists for being an "outsider" to the art scene, having not studied it academically.

== Art career ==
Nasr broke into the international art scene in 2001 when one of the leading Italian art galleries, Galleria Continua, exhibited his work. Nasr has participated in many exhibitions since and has won many awards including: third place in the 7th Salon of Youth, a contest organized by the Ministry of Culture in 1995, the Prize of Painting in the Heliorama exhibition from the French Cultural center in Cairo in 1997, the Grand Prize in the 8th International Cairo Biennale in 2001, the Biennale Prize from Dakar Biennale in Senegal in 2002, the Ministry of Culture Prize, Dak’art Biennale, Dakar, Senegal in 2004 and the Grand Prize, Sharjah Bienniale, UAE in 2005.

In November 2008, Nasr founded Darb 1718. Darb 1718 is an Egyptian contemporary art and culture center located in the Fustat area of Old Cairo. It is a registered non-profit organization with the stated mission of being "a trampoline to advance the burgeoning contemporary art movement in Egypt." It also aims at presenting local and international contemporary art, archiving artwork and maintaining a comprehensive database of art in Egypt and the MENA area, as well as acting as an educational front by providing workshops, projects and film screenings. The center also aims to engage the local Fustat community through community service and outreach programs. Nasr participated in the 2017 Venice Biennial with a video installation at the Egypt pavilion.

== Notable works ==
- "El Shaab" (الشعب "The People"), painted ceramics, 2012
