= Ramy Essam =

Egyptian musician (born 1987)

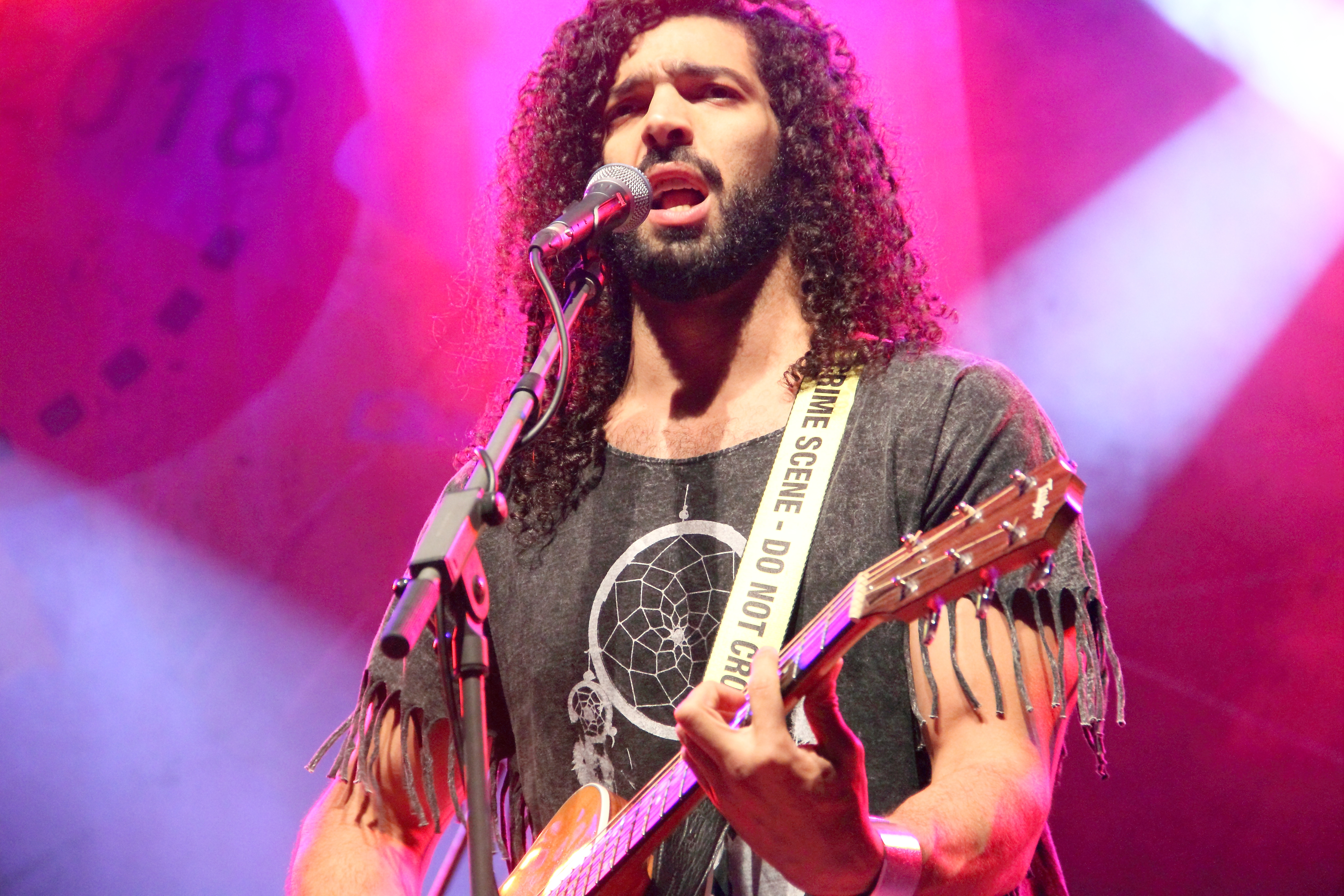
- Ramy Essam at the July 2018 Rudolstadt-Festival in Rudolstadt/Thuringia, Germany
- Born: 1987 (age 38–39); Mansoura, Egypt
- Occupation: Musician

Ramy Essam (Arabic: رامي عصام, pronounced [ˈɾɑːmi ʕeˈsˤɑːm]; born 1987 in Mansoura) is an Egyptian musician. He is best known for his appearances in Tahrir Square in Cairo during the Egyptian Revolution of 2011, and has been called the voice of the Egyptian revolution.

Essam stands for gender equality, LGBTQ+ rights, freedom, social justice, equity, health care, minority rights, education and peace as it can be found in his music. His songs feature the themes of corruption, censorship, women's and workers' rights, political prisoners, economic exploitation and torture.

== Early life ==
The second of four children, Ramy Essam's father died when he was 11. He completed three and a half years of a five-year architecture degree in Mansoura, before the advent of the Egyptian revolution.

== 2011 Egyptian Revolution ==
When the Egyptian revolution began, Essam travelled to Cairo with his guitar and began performing in Tahrir square, turning the crowd's chants into songs. He began performing in front of millions of people, and the song "Irhal", in which then Egyptian president Hosni Mubarak was urged to resign, gained popularity among the demonstrators. It became widely-known through YouTube, and is referred to as the anthem of the revolution. In 2011, it was selected by Time Out as the third-most world-changing song of all time.

When Tahrir Square was cleared by soldiers on 9 March 2011, Essam was arrested, taken to the nearby Egyptian Museum, and tortured.

== Repression and exile ==
In 2013, Essam's songs were banned in Egypt and he was forbidden from performing. His fans were harassed by police if his music was found on their phones.

After the 2014 Egyptian presidential election, Essam was detained and interrogated for his history of anti-police songs. He left to live in Finland and Sweden later that year, receiving a fellowship with International Cities of Refuge Network which gave him the chance to create and perform freely to spread his message as an ambassador of the Egyptian revolution.

During 2016 and 2017, Essam toured throughout Finland with the theatre monologue RAMY – In the Frontline, which also received 5 stars reviews at the Fringe Festival Edinburgh. In 2021, Essam performed at Access Now's 10th anniversary edition of RightsCon.

His 2018 song "Balaha", a satirical criticism of Egypt's military rulers, led to six individuals being arrested in Egypt that were, either correctly or incorrectly, assumed to be connected to Essam and the song. Among them were the writer of the song's lyrics, poet Galal El-Behairy, and a former band member that had not worked on the record. Essam's passport was revoked by the Egyptian government, leaving him paperless and unable to travel.

In May 2020, one of the detainees, filmmaker Shady Habash, died after being incarcerated for more than two years in pretrial detention. Egypt's public prosecutor claimed that Habash mistakenly drank hand sanitiser in his cell, thinking it was water.

== Discography ==
=== Albums ===
- Manshourat (2011)
- El Masala (2012)
- Mamnoua' (2014)
- Resala Ela Magles El Amn ("A Letter To The UN Security Council") (2017)
  In 2017, Essam released his album on Universal Music MENA. The album is a mix of re-recorded older tracks and new compositions. The lyrical topics range from depictions of daily hardships of normal people, the struggle for social justice and women's rights, environmental issues and criticism of the regime.

=== Singles ===
- Segn Bel Alwan (2016)
  (featuring Lebanese rapper Malikah) was released in 2016. The song highlighting women's situation and the issue of gender equality in his home country, became a big hit and one of the most streamed videos in Egypt in the weeks after its release.
- The Camp (2017)
  Essam collaborated with UK artist PJ Harvey, released in June 2017 to benefit displaced children in the Lebanese Bekaa Valley fleeing the Syrian Civil War.
- Balaha (2018)
  On February 26, 2018, Essam released a song and music video called Balaha which mocked Egyptian president Abdel Fatah al-Sisi. Balaha led to eight arrests back in Egypt; two remain in detention as of April 2020, and a third, music video director Shady Habash, died in prison in 2020, allegedly from "health issues not yet specified", at the age of twenty-four after living over two years in pre-trial detention. The video has received over five million YouTube views.
- Muqawma (Resistance) (2021)
  A song based on a poem by Egyptian activist Ahmed Douma from the revolutionaries of Egypt to the revolutionaries of Palestine.

== Awards, nominations and honors ==
- #3 on the list "100 Songs That Changed History", Timeout Magazine
- "Freedom To Create" prize winner, 2011
- Music Rights Champion, 2016, International Music Council
- Spirit of Folk Award, 2017, Folk Alliance Festival, US
- GrupYorum Award, 2020, “Tenco 2020 Award” - Sanremo - Italy
