= Cairo Contemporary Dance Center =

Cairo Contemporary Dance Center (CCDC) is an independent space for contemporary dance in Egypt. It’s the first contemporary dance school in Africa and the Middle East, offering a 3-year full-time professional training program for young dancers, choreographers and dance teachers. It also provides artistic residencies, as well as open classes and workshops in different kinds of dance and activities.

== History ==
Cairo Contemporary Dance Center was founded in 2012 by Karima Mansour, under the patronage of the Egyptian Ministry of Culture, at the Creativity Center on the ground of Cairo Opera House.

It moved to its current location in January 2014, and currently operates as an independent project under the umbrella of MAAT for Contemporary Art.

== The school ==
Cairo Contemporary Dance Center was the first professional contemporary dance full-time school in Africa and the Arab world. The 3-year full-time professional training program is officially recognized by the UNESCO International Dance Council. The first generation of students graduated in June 2015, and a new generation started the three year program in September 2016.

CCDC welcomes every year a diversity of international and Egyptian teachers, including Laurance Rudic, Vincent Mantsoe, Mark Tompkins, Olivier Dubois, and Claude Brumachon.

== Other activities ==
In addition to its professional training, CCDC also offers to the general public open classes and workshops for adults and children in several disciplines covering dance, martial arts and other activities. Workshops are also regularly organized with invited local and international artists, in different disciplines including contemporary dance, contact improvisation, acting, tango, and yoga.

Cairo Contemporary Dance Center participates in the independent contemporary art scene in Egypt, and regularly organizes performances or dance presentations. In the recent years, CCDC has participated in or organized the following events:

- Hal Badeel Arts Festival (April 2013)
- Kalamonology exhibition at Cairo’s Ofok Gallery (May 2013)
- Contemporary Dance Night 2013 (November 2013)
- The Platform, 1st edition, an international gathering of dancers from all over the world (December 2014)
- D-CAF (April 2015)
- Dance in Transit/ Mahatat (February 2016)
- Rough Stage/ French Institute (November 2016)
- Abla Fahita TV show/ Radio Theater (January 2018)
- The Platform, 2nd edition/ El Nahda Jesuit Cairo (December 2018)
- The Platform, 3r edition/ French Institute, Cimatheque, and Zawya (April 2019)
- Karima Mansour to write International Dance Day message (April 2019)

=== '5 ra2s' Festival ===
In February 2017, CCDC organized the '5 ra2s' festival, to celebrate the graduation of the first generation of students from its full-time training program and its 5th anniversary. Many events took place in various independent art spaces in Cairo, such as Zawya cinema, Zigzag club or Room Art Space and Cafe.

=== MAAT Kicks Off ===
Founded in Cairo by artist and choreographer Karima Mansour, MAAT Contemporary Dance Company is the first Egyptian independent dance company of its kind. MAAT will introduce its new format in May 2018, after having grown significantly in scope and depth in the two decades since its creation in 1999.

(The name of the dance company itself, MAAT, is a reference to the ancient Egyptian goddess of truth, justice, cosmic awareness, and self-awareness who was also attributed with regulating the seasons and the movement of the stars. Egypt was once referred to as the “Land of the Nile and Maat.”)

Since 1999 until now, MAAT presented more than 20 dance performances. MAAT‘s primary aims are introducing contemporary dance to local and international audiences, but also creating opportunities for audiences to form a deep appreciation for contemporary arts in general–and contemporary dance in particular. Moreover, MAAT actively participates in cultivating new concepts concerning the general perception of contemporary art.

MAAT actively supports the local contemporary dance scene in Egypt and networks regionally and internationally with performers, choreographers, instructors, and academic theorists.

MAAT combines theories and practices from around the globe and considers them in their respective social and political contexts. The company then expertly adapts and integrates them into an Egyptian contemporary dance context. MAAT’s performances themselves are primarily produced in collaboration with the graduates of the full-time professional training program of the Cairo Contemporary Dance Center (CCDC).

MAAT Dance Company Relaunch Event: In May 2018 MAAT Dance Company relaunched in its new format by performing three different productions, The launching took place at AUC Falaki Theater and Gallery. For 6 days in a row, MAAT’s performances were kicked off with full house daily attendance with an estimation of 1368 audience in total as per maximum theatre capacity.
