= Darb 1718 =

Coordinates: 30°00′12″N 31°13′55″E

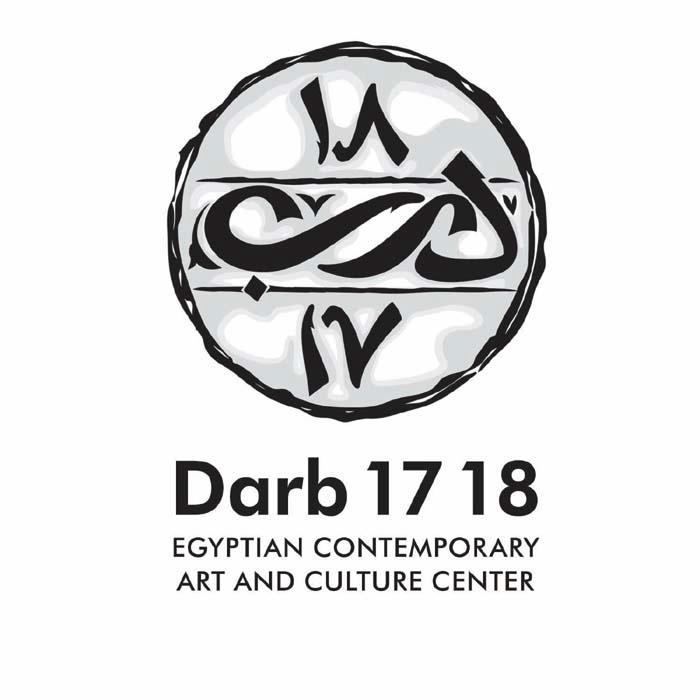
- Logo of Darb 1718
- Founder: Moataz Nasr
- Established: 2008
- Mission: To cultivate the burgeoning contemporary art movement in Egypt
- Focus: art & culture center
- Location: Shera Kasr el Shame', Fustat, Old Cairo, Cairo, Egypt
- Website: www.darb1718.com

Darb 1718 (Arabic: درب ١٧١٨) is an Egyptian contemporary art and culture center located in the Fustat area of Old Cairo. As a registered non-profit, charity organization Darb 1718 seeks to encourage experimentation by supporting new works by emerging artists with particular attention to artistic merit, diversity of media and aesthetic traditions, along with originality of cultural influences. It thereby acts as “a trampoline to advance the burgeoning contemporary art movement in Egypt.” It also aims at presenting local and international contemporary art, archiving artwork and maintaining a comprehensive database of art in Egypt, as well as acting as an educational front through providing workshops, projects and film screenings. The center also aims to engage the local Fustat community through community service and outreach programs.

== History ==
Since 2008 Darb 1718 is the brainchild of Egyptian visual artist and cultural activist Moataz Nasr.

== Location and Venues ==
Located in the Fustat area of Old Cairo, Darb 1718 is surrounded by omnipresent archaeological treasures. The millennium-old Mosque of Amr Ibn el ‘Aas (built in 642 AD and known to be the first mosque built on the African continent), the Babylon Fortress (1st Century AD), the Hanging Church (690-692 AD), the Greek Church of St. George (10th century) and the Coptic Museum (1910) are all walking distance from Darb 1718. These historic sites create a striking canvas for Darb 1718’s mandate.

To find a map about Darb 1718's surroundings and how to get there see .
Nestled behind the old city of Fustat, the ancient ruins of Roman, Islamic, and Coptic civilizations, Darb 1718 is an alive and modern contemporary art space complete with two contemporary art galleries, two live performance stages, a large outdoor cinema, workshop areas, roof lounges, and artist-in-residence studio and living space.
