= Downtown Contemporary Arts Festival =

Downtown Contemporary Arts Festival (D-CAF)
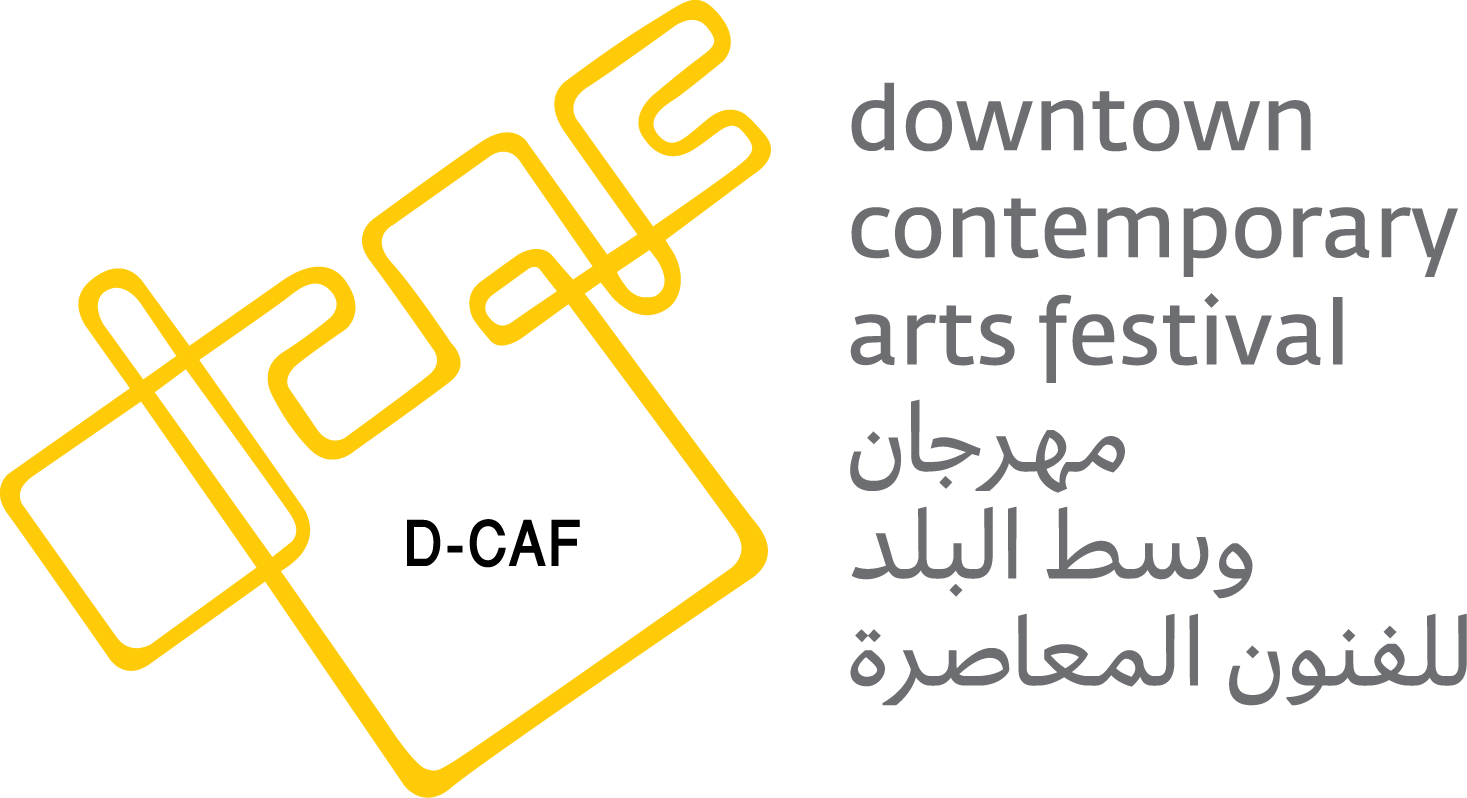
- Genre: Contemporary arts, festival, visual arts, theater, film, music
- Dates: March–April
- Frequency: Annually
- Location: Cairo
- Country: Egypt
- Founded: 2012
- Website: d-caf.org

Downtown Contemporary Arts Festival (D-CAF, Arabic: مهرجان وسط البلد للفنون المعاصرة-) is Cairo’s largest international multi-disciplinary contemporary arts festival. It takes place over three weeks each spring, since 2012, in multiple sites throughout Cairo’s city center. Established one year after the 25th of January 2011 revolution, D-CAF is an independent initiative of a group of organizations.

D-CAF presents local, regional and international alternative theater and dance performances, music concerts, visual arts shows, film screenings, art lectures and workshops, by emerging and avant-garde artists from around the world.

D-CAF is annually supported by cultural councils, embassies, and foundations, such as the British Council, Institut Français, Goethe Institut, Pro Helvetia, Austrian Cultural Forum, Balassi Institut, Drosos, Tamasi Collective, and Embassies of U.S.A, Denmark, Netherlands, Spain, Canada, Australia, Ireland, etc.

== Downtown Cairo ==
D-CAF was co-founded by Ahmed El Attar from Orient Productions and Karim Shafei from Al Ismaelia for Real Estate Investment in 2012.

== Arab Arts Focus ==
D-CAF hosts a biennial Arab Arts Focus (AAF) showcase during the festival in Cairo, where invited international programmers/delegates fly-in to attend a four day program of the latest in contemporary performances by Arab artists.
