= Egypt =

Country in North Africa

Arab Republic of Egypt جمهورية مصر العربية (Arabic) Gumhūriyyat Miṣr al-ʻArabiyyah
- Flag Coat of arms
- Anthem: بلادي، بلادي، بلادي; Biladi, Biladi, Biladi ("My country, my country, my country")
- Capital and largest city: Cairo; 30°2′N 31°13′E
- De facto capital: The New Capital
- Official languages: Arabic
- National language: Egyptian Arabic (Note: Literary Arabic is the sole official language. Egyptian Arabic is the spoken language. Other dialects and minority languages are spoken regionally.)
- Religion: See Religion in Egypt (Note: While Islam is the majority and official religion of the country, the size of the country's historic Christian minority is highly controversial and disputed by various entities and groups. Estimates range from as low as 5% to as high as 20%. Since 2006, religion has been omitted from censuses after widespread claims that the figures had been distorted.)
- Demonym: Egyptian
- Government: Unitary semi-presidential republic under an authoritarian government
  - President: Abdel Fattah el-Sisi
  - Prime Minister: Mostafa Madbouly
- Legislature: Parliament
  - Upper house: Senate
  - Lower house: House of Representatives

Establishment history
  - Declaration of independence: 28 February 1922
  - Revolution of 1952: 23 July 1952
  - Declaration of the Republic: 18 June 1953
  - Current constitution: 18 January 2014

Area
  - Total: 1,010,408 km^{2} (390,121 sq mi) (29th)
  - Water (%): 0.632

Population
  - 2026 estimate: ▲120,101,175 (15th)
  - 2017 census: ▲94,798,827
  - Density: 120.7/km^{2} (312.6/sq mi) (103rd)
- GDP (PPP): 2026 estimate
  - Total: ▲$2.600 trillion (18th)
  - Per capita: ▲$23,624 (87th)
- GDP (nominal): 2026 estimate
  - Total: ▲$442.886 billion (41st)
  - Per capita: ▲$4,024 (135th)
- Gini (2021): ▼28.5 low inequality
- HDI (2023): ▲0.754 high (100th)
- Currency: Egyptian pound (LE/E£/£E) (EGP)
- Time zone: UTC+2 (EET (Note: Known locally as Egypt Standard Time (EGY) (Arabic: توقيت مصر القياسي Tawqīt Miṣr al-qiyāsiyy)))
  - Summer (DST): UTC+3 (EEST (Note: See Daylight saving time in Egypt.))
- Calling code: +20
- ISO 3166 code: EG
- Internet TLD: .eg; مصر.

Egypt, (Note: Arabic: مصر, romanized: Miṣr, pronounced [mɪsˤr], Egyptian Arabic: [mɑsˤr]) officially the Arab Republic of Egypt, (Note: Arabic: جمهورية مصر العربية, romanized: Gumhūriyyat Miṣr al-ʻArabiyyah) is a country spanning the northeast corner of Africa and southwest corner of Asia via the Sinai Peninsula. It is bordered by the Mediterranean Sea to the north, Palestine and Israel to the northeast, the Red Sea to the east, Sudan and the Sahara to the south, and Libya to the west. The Gulf of Aqaba in the northeast separates Egypt from Jordan and Saudi Arabia. Cairo is the capital, largest city, and leading cultural centre, while Alexandria is the second-largest city and an important hub of industry and tourism. With over 107 million inhabitants, Egypt is the most populous country in the Arab world, third-most populous country in Africa, and 15th-most populated in the world.

Egypt has one of the longest histories of any country, tracing its heritage along the Nile Delta back to the 6th–4th millennia BCE. Considered a cradle of civilisation, Ancient Egypt saw some of the earliest developments of writing, agriculture, urbanisation, organised religion and central government. Following nearly three millennia of pharaonic rule, Egypt came under foreign rule beginning in the 6th century BC. Egypt was an early and important centre of Christianity, later adopting Islam from the seventh century onwards. Alexandria, Egypt's former capital and currently second largest city, was a hub of global knowledge through its Library. Cairo became the capital of the Fatimid Caliphate in the tenth century and of the subsequent Mamluk Sultanate in the 13th century. Egypt then became part of the Ottoman Empire in 1517, until its local ruler Muhammad Ali established modern Egypt as an autonomous Khedivate in 1867. The country was then occupied by the British Empire along with Sudan and gained independence in 1922 as a monarchy.

After the 1948 Arab–Israeli War, Egypt occupied the Gaza Strip. Following the 1952 revolution, Egypt declared itself a republic. In 1958, Egypt merged with Syria to form the United Arab Republic, with Syria withdrawing in 1961 after their coup. Egypt fought several armed conflicts with Israel in 1948, 1956, 1967 and 1973. After the 1967 war, Egypt lost the Sinai Peninsula and the Gaza Strip to Israel. In 1978, Egypt signed the Camp David Accords, which recognised Israel and heavily demilitarised the Sinai in exchange for the latter's withdrawal from the occupied Sinai, completely turning over control of the Sinai to Egypt in 1982. After the Arab Spring, which led to the 2011 Egyptian revolution and overthrow of Hosni Mubarak, the country faced a protracted period of political unrest; its first democratic election in 2012 resulted in the short-lived, Muslim Brotherhood-aligned government of Mohamed Morsi, which was overthrown by the military after mass protests in 2013. The current government is a semi-presidential republic led by Abdel Fattah el-Sisi, who gained power in the 2013 Egyptian coup d'état. Sisi is widely described as a dictator, with subsequent presidential elections consistently characterized by international observers as neither free nor fair.

Egypt is a developing country with the second-largest economy in Africa. It is considered to be a regional power in the Middle East, North Africa and the Muslim world, and a middle power worldwide. Islam is the official religion and Arabic its official language. Egypt is a founding member of the United Nations, the Non-Aligned Movement, the Arab League, the African Union, Organisation of Islamic Cooperation, World Youth Forum, and a member of BRICS.

== Names ==
Ancient Egypt had several names; one of them was (𓆎 𓅓 𓏏𓊖) km.t, which is formed from 𓆎 𓅓, meaning black. This likely refers to the fertile black soils of the Nile floodplains, distinct from the deshret ⟨dšṛt⟩, or 'red land' of the desert. This name is commonly vocalised as Kemet [kɛmɛt], but was pronounced differently in Ancient Egyptian. Scholars reconstruct its Old Egyptian pronunciation as [ˈkuːmat], its Middle Egyptian pronunciation as [ˈkuːmaʔ], and its Late Egyptian pronunication as [ˈkeːmə]. The name is realised as K(h)ēmə (Bohairic: ⲭⲏⲙⲓ, Sahidic: ⲕⲏⲙⲉ) in Egyptian Coptic, and appeared in Early Greek as Χημία (Khēmía). Another name was ⟨tꜣ-mry⟩ 'land of the riverbank'.

The names of Upper and Lower Egypt were Ta-Sheme'aw (⟨tꜣ-šmꜥw⟩) 'sedgeland' and Ta-Mehew (⟨tꜣ mḥw⟩) 'northland', respectively. They were also collectively called tꜣwy (tāwy), meaning 'The Two Lands', referring to both Lower Egypt and Upper Egypt after unification.

The English name Egypt is derived from the Ancient Greek Aígyptos (Αἴγυπτος), via Middle French Egypte and Latin Aegyptus. It is reflected in early Greek Linear B tablets as a-ku-pi-ti-yo. The ancient Greek geographer Strabo provided a folk etymology stating that Αἴγυπτος (Aigýptios) had originally evolved as a compound from Aἰγαίου ὑπτίως (Aegaeou huptiōs), meaning 'below the Aegean'. Another tradition claims that it was named after the legendary king Aegyptus. The actual derivation is thought to be from 'ḥwt-kꜣ-ptḥ (Hutkaptah, Late Egyptian pronunciation [ħəjˌkojpəˈtaħ]), 'temple of the Ka of Ptah," a term for the city of Memphis.

Greco-Roman writers report that Egypt was sometimes called Aeria (Ἀερία). Stephanus of Byzantium derives the name from aer (ἀήρ, 'air'), explaining that Egypt was a "misty land". From this name, the ethnic form Aerioi (Ἀέριοι) is also recorded for its inhabitants. Thomas George Tucker suggested that Aeria could derive not only from "misty" or "hazy air", but also be understood in the sense of "far-off" or "dimly seen".

Miṣr (Arabic pronunciation: [misˤɾ]; مِصر) is the Classical Quranic Arabic and modern official name of Egypt, while Maṣr (Egyptian Arabic pronunciation: [mɑsˤɾ]; مَصر) is the local pronunciation in Egyptian Arabic. The current name of Egypt, Misr/Misir/Misru, stems from the Ancient Semitic name for it. The term originally connoted "Civilisation" or "Metropolis". Classical Arabic Miṣr (Egyptian Arabic: Maṣr) is directly cognate with the Biblical Hebrew Miṣráyīm (מִצְרַיִם / מִצְרָיִם), meaning 'the two straits', a reference to the predynastic separation of Upper and Lower Egypt. Also mentioned in several Semitic languages as Mesru, Misir and Masar. The oldest attestation of this name for Egypt is the Akkadian mi-iṣ-ru (miṣru) related to miṣru/miṣirru/miṣaru, meaning 'border' or 'frontier'. The Neo-Assyrian Empire used the derived term , Mu-ṣur.

== History ==
=== Prehistoric Egypt ===
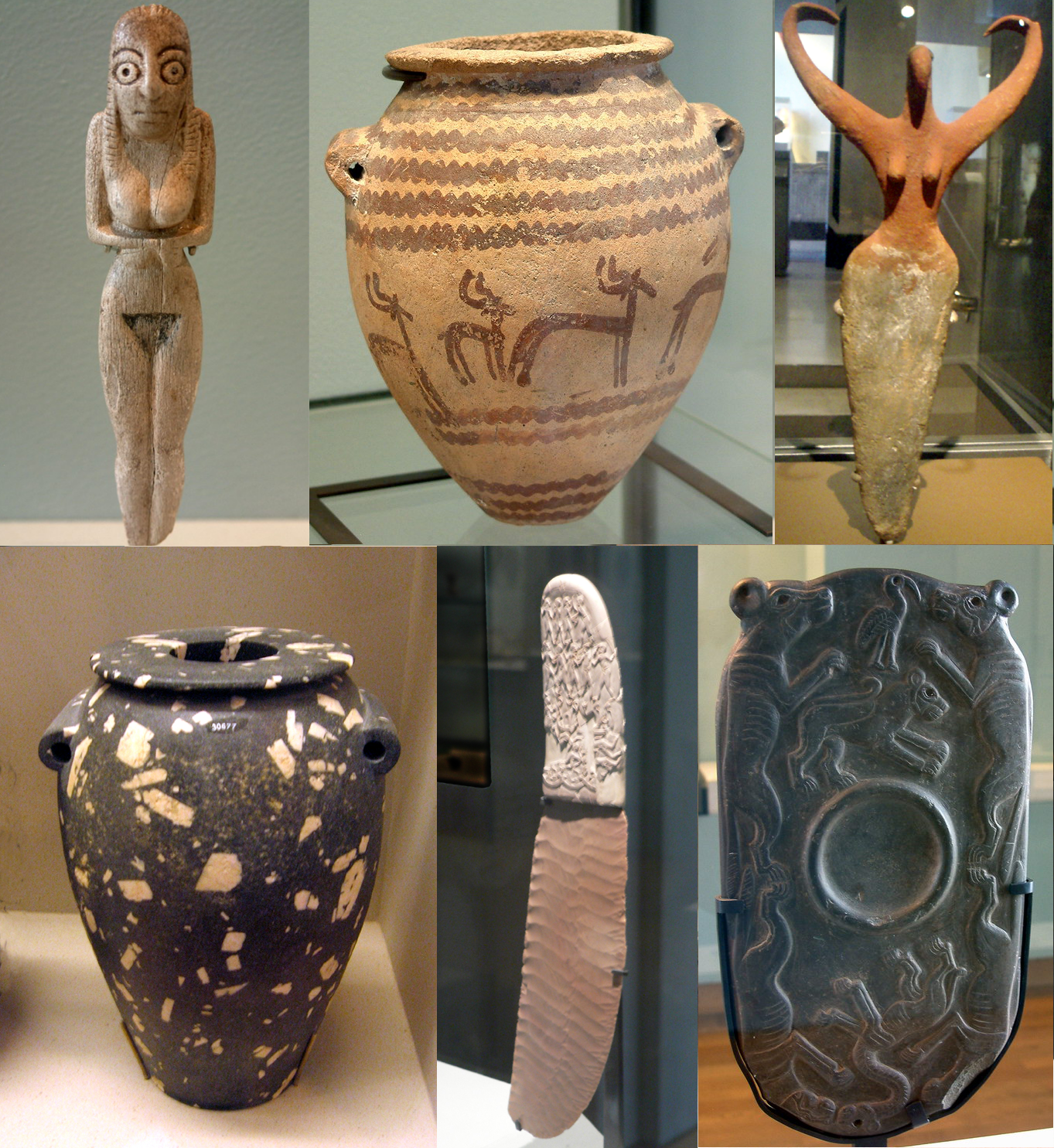
Clockwise: a Badarian mortuary figurine, a Naqada jar, a Naqada statuette of the goddess Bat, the Four dogs palette, the Gebel el-Arak Knife, and a Naqada diorite vase.

Evidence of rock carvings along the Nile and in surrounding oases indicates early habitation. In the 10th millennium BCE, a culture of hunter-gatherers and fishers was replaced by a grain-grinding culture. Climate changes or overgrazing around 8000 BCE began to desiccate the pastoral lands of Egypt, forming the Sahara. Early tribal peoples migrated to the Nile River where they developed a settled agricultural economy and more centralised society.

By about 6000 BCE, a Neolithic culture took root in the Nile Valley. During the Neolithic era, several predynastic cultures developed independently in Upper and Lower Egypt. The Badarian culture and the successor Naqada series are generally regarded as precursors to dynastic Egypt. The earliest known Lower Egyptian site, Merimda, predates the Badarian by about seven hundred years. Contemporaneous Lower Egyptian communities coexisted with their southern counterparts for more than two thousand years, remaining culturally distinct, but maintaining frequent contact through trade. The earliest known evidence of Egyptian hieroglyphic inscriptions appeared during the predynastic period on Naqada III pottery vessels, dated to about 3200 BCE.

=== Ancient Egypt (3150 BCE–305 BCE) ===
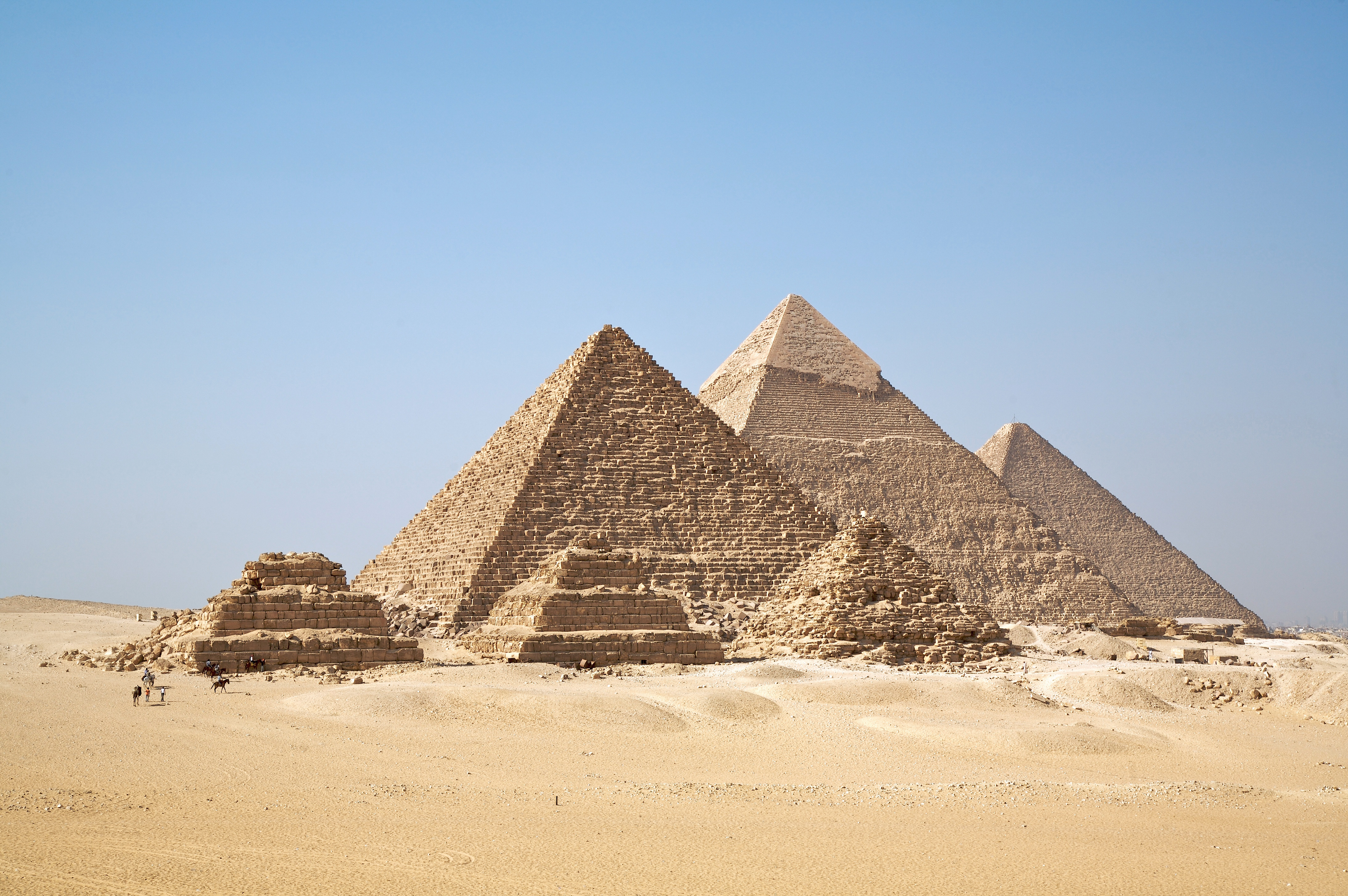
The Giza Necropolis is the oldest of the ancient Wonders and the only one still in existence.

Around c. 3150 BCE, King Menes unified Egypt, establishing a succession of dynasties that ruled for three millennia. Egyptian civilisation thrived with distinctive achievements in religion, art, and writing. The Old Kingdom (c. 2700–2200 BCE) saw the construction of the pyramids, including those at Giza. A brief interregnum followed, succeeded by the Middle Kingdom (c. 2040 BCE), a phase of renewed stability and prosperity under rulers such as Amenemhat III.

After the Second Intermediate Period and the Hyksos occupation, Egypt was reunified by Ahmose I, founder of the Eighteenth Dynasty and the New Kingdom (c. 1550–1070 BCE). This era marked Egypt's height as a major power in the region, extending influence into Nubia and the Levant. It produced many of Egypt's most renowned Pharaohs, Hatshepsut, Thutmose III, Akhenaten, Tutankhamun, and Ramesses II, and witnessed the rise of Atenism, one of the earliest forms of monotheism. Despite later invasions by Libyans, Nubians, and Assyrians, native dynasties eventually reasserted control.

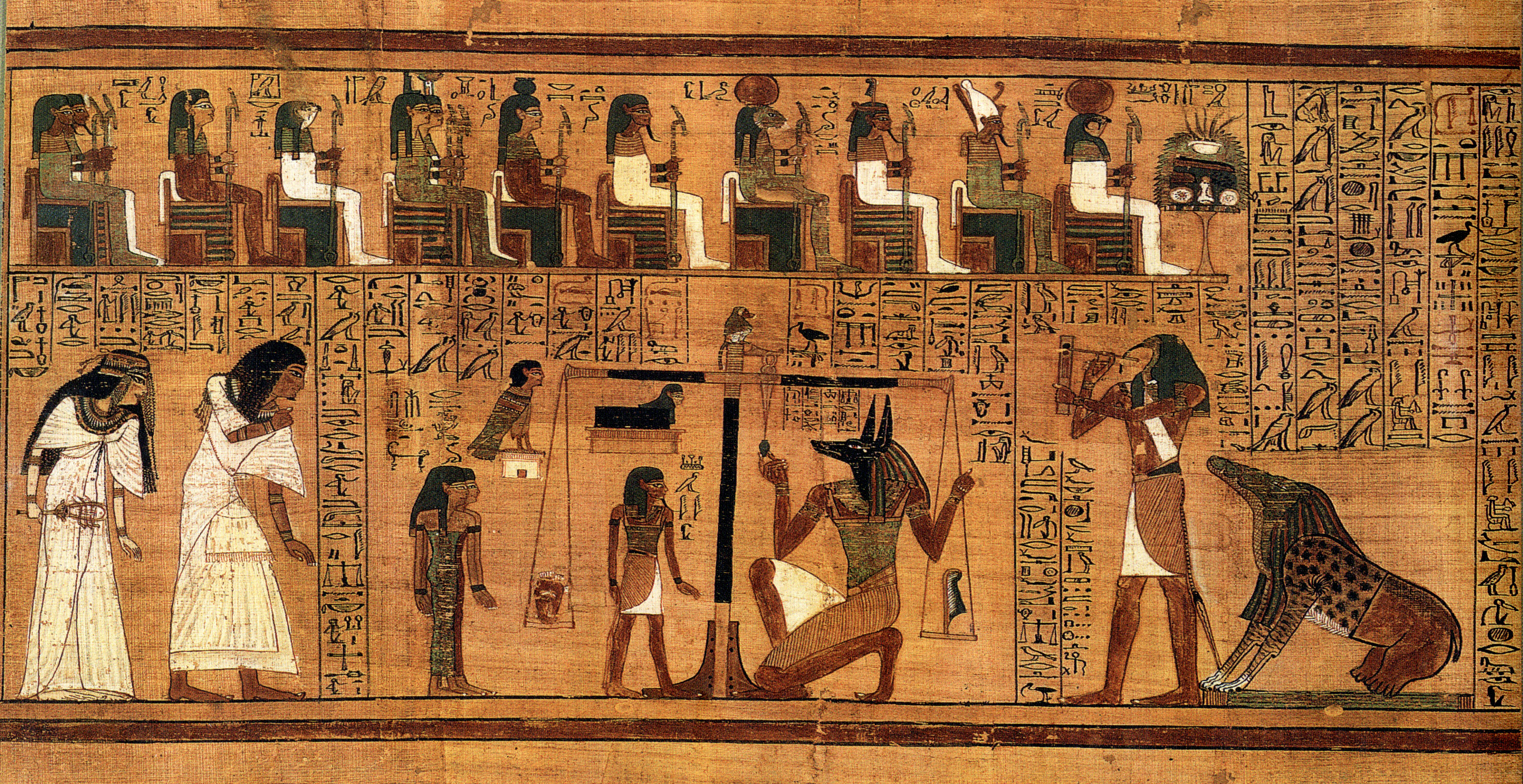
The Weighing of the Heart from the Book of the Dead of Ani

In 525 BCE, Cambyses II of Persia conquered Egypt, beginning the Achaemenid satrapy period (the Twenty-seventh Dynasty). Although several revolts occurred, Egypt remained under Persian control until briefly regaining independence before falling again in 343 BCE. The Thirtieth Dynasty was the last native royal house. Following renewed Persian domination, Alexander the Great conquered Egypt in 332 BCE, after which his general Ptolemy I Soter established the Ptolemaic dynasty.

=== Ptolemaic and Roman Egypt (305 BCE–641 CE) ===
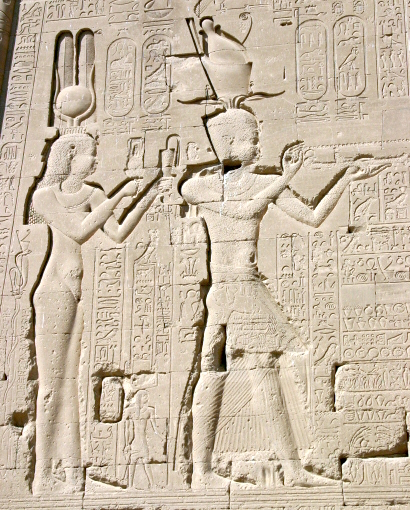
The Ptolemaic Queen Cleopatra VII and her son by Julius Caesar, Caesarion, at the Temple of Dendera

The Ptolemaic Kingdom was a Hellenistic state from southern Syria to Cyrene and south to Nubia, with Alexandria as its capital and a centre of Greek culture and trade. The Ptolemies adopted pharaonic traditions to legitimise their rule, appearing on monuments in Egyptian style and participating in local religious life. The Lighthouse of Alexandria, built c. 280 BCE, was one of the Seven Wonders of the Ancient World, later destroyed by earthquakes. The last ruler, Cleopatra VII, committed suicide after Octavian captured Alexandria, ending the dynasty and paving the way for Roman annexation. Native rebellions and dynastic disputes weakened the kingdom, facilitating its annexation by Rome.

Egypt was a wealthy imperial province of the Roman Empire, supplying grain and hosting the major city of Alexandria. Governed with Roman administration and Hellenistic culture, its population primarily spoke Greek in major cities and Coptic Egyptian in rural areas. Christianity reached Egypt in the 1st century, brought by Saint Mark the Evangelist. During Diocletian's reign (284–305 CE), the New Testament had been translated into Egyptian and many Egyptian Christians were persecuted. By CE 451, a distinct Coptic Church was firmly established.

=== Medieval Egypt (641–1517) ===
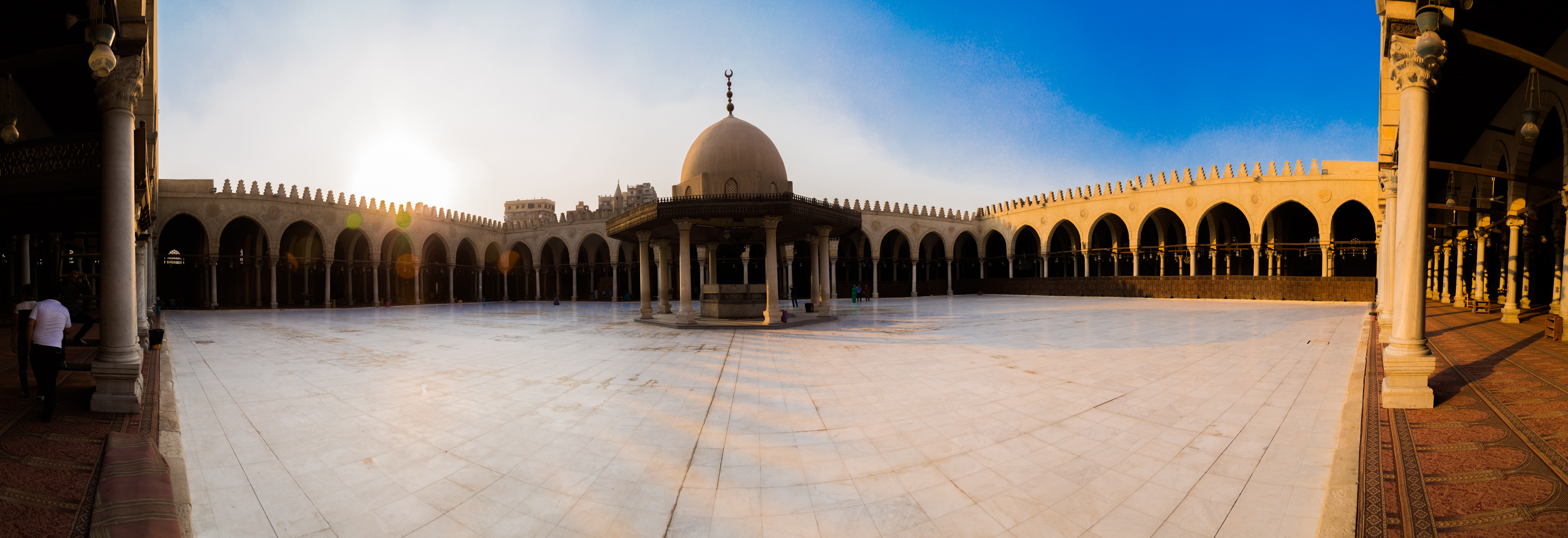
The Amr ibn al-As mosque in Cairo, recognised as the oldest in Africa

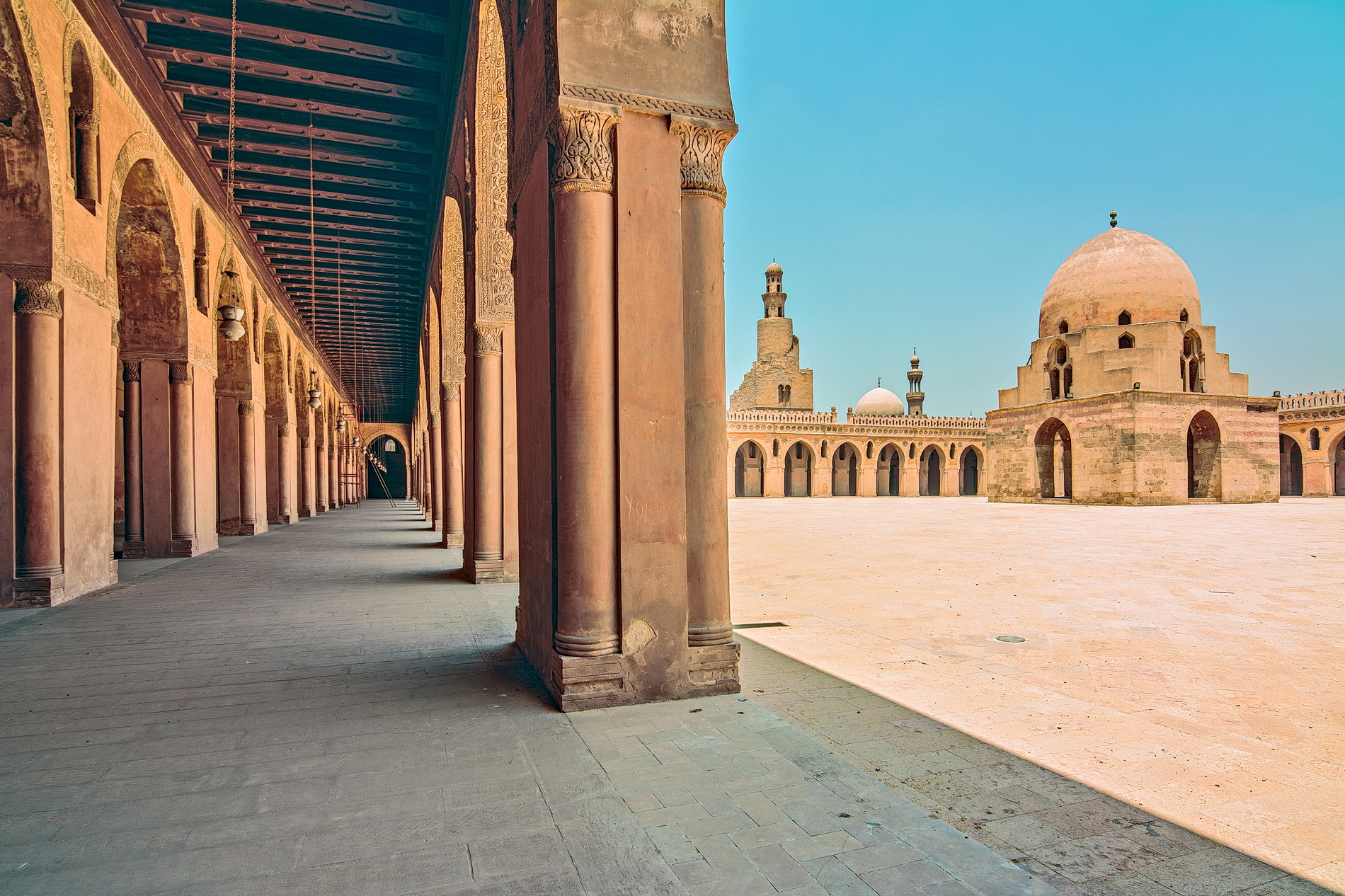
The Ibn Tulun Mosque in Cairo, of Ahmad Ibn Tulun

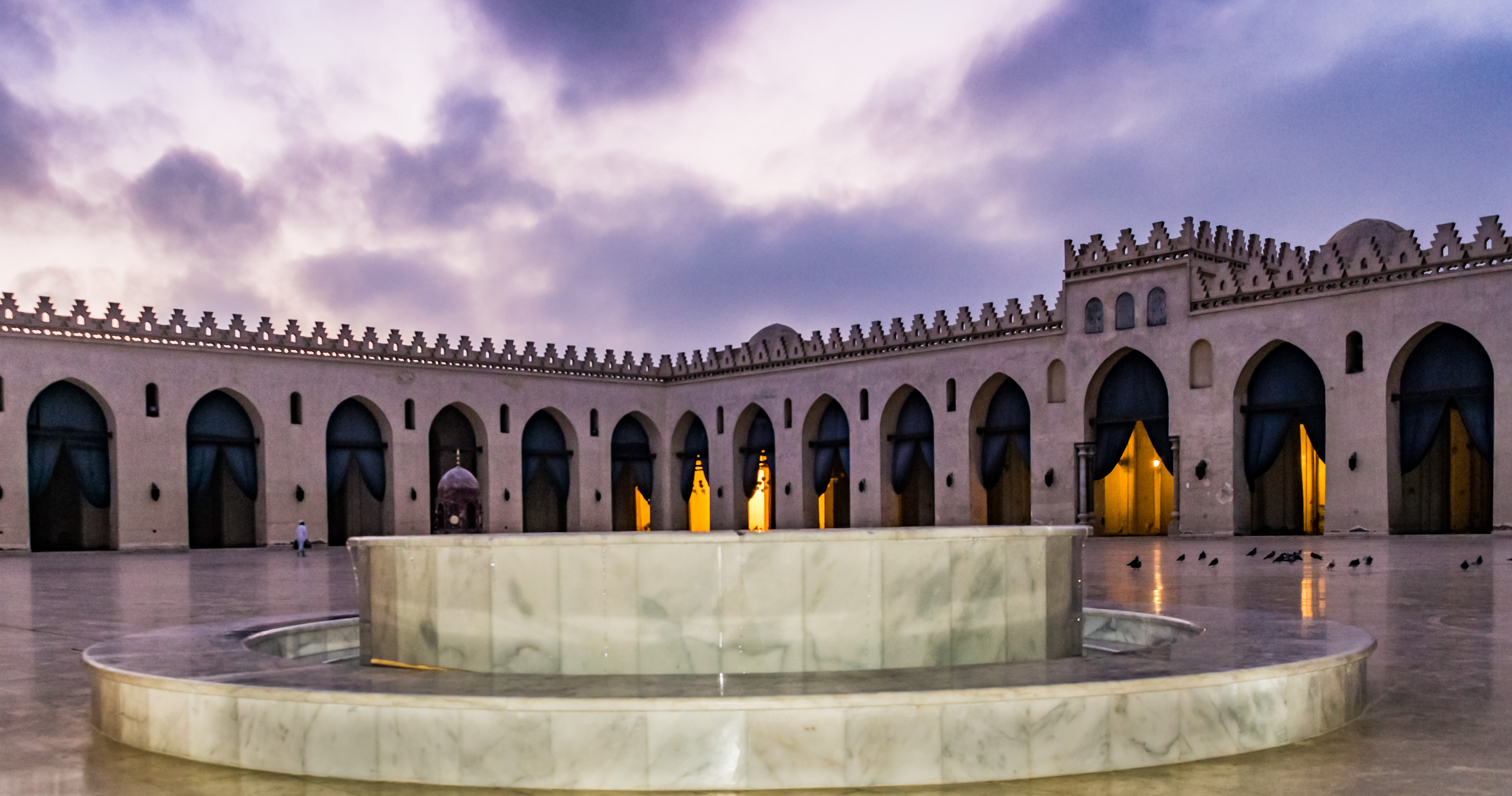
The Al-Hakim Mosque in Cairo, of Al-Hakim bi-Amr Allah, the sixth Fatimid caliph

The Byzantines regained control of Egypt after a brief Sasanid Persian invasion early in the 7th century, until 639–42, when the country was conquered by Arab Muslim forces under Amr ibn al-As during the Early Muslim conquests. The Arabs defeated the Byzantine armies, bringing Islam to Egypt. Alexandria briefly returned to Byzantine control in 645 but fell again to the Arabs in 646. In 654, an invasion fleet sent by Constans II was repulsed. The Arabs founded Fustat, later replaced by Cairo in 969.

Under the Abbasid caliphate, Egypt was governed through deputies residing in Baghdad. Revolts occurred frequently, including the Egyptian revolt of 828 and the uprising of 831 when Copts joined Muslims against the government. Semi-independent dynasties arose, including the Tulunid dynasty (868–905) and Ikhshidid dynasty (935–969), which maintained Abbasid allegiance while exercising local authority.

The Fatimid Caliphate ruled Egypt from the 10th century, with Cairo as their capital. After the Fatimids, the Ayyubid dynasty governed until 1250, when the Mamluks, a military caste of Turco-Circassian origin, took control. The Mamluks ruled Egypt for the next three centuries and maintained control over parts of the Levant. By the late 13th century, Egypt linked trade routes connecting the Red Sea with India, Malaya, and the East Indies. The mid-14th century Black Death killed about 40% of Egypt's population.

=== Ottoman Egypt (1517–1867) ===
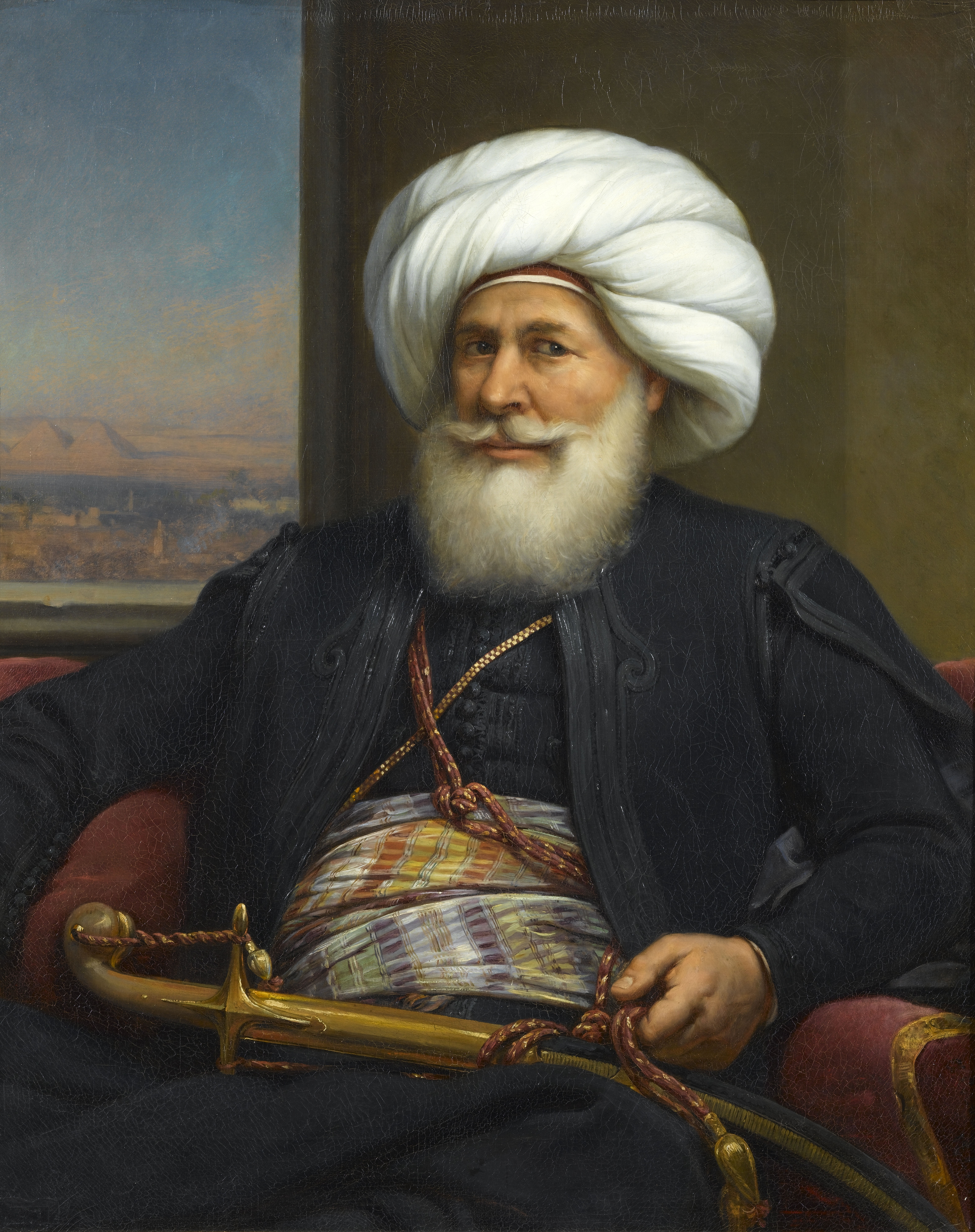
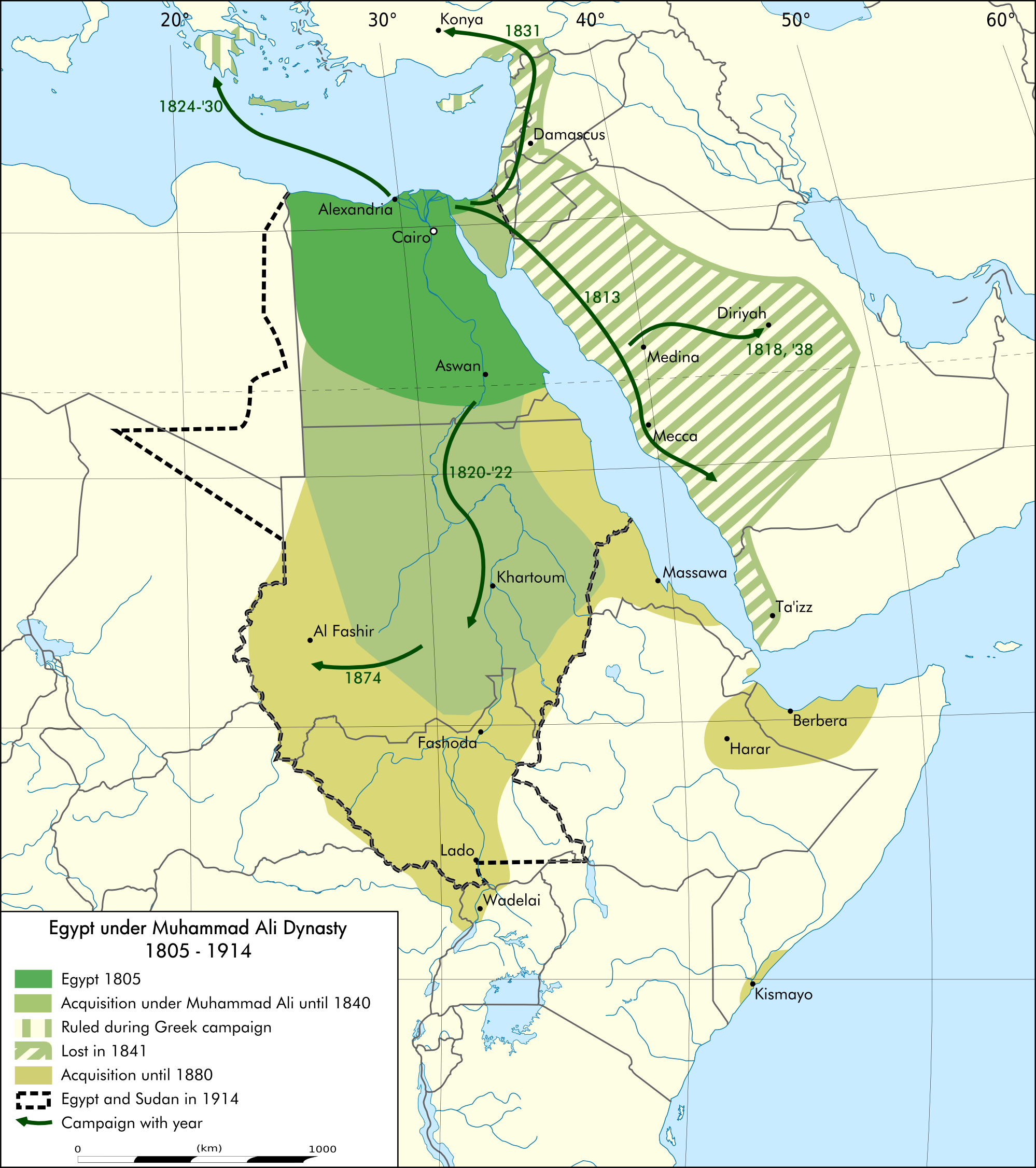
Muhammad Ali, founder of the Muhammad Ali dynasty, and the extent of their realm.

Egypt was conquered by the Ottomans in 1517, following the defeat of the Mamluk Sultanate, and became a province of the Ottoman Empire. The Mamluks, who had dominated Egypt's military and political life for centuries, retained influence under Ottoman rule, creating a semi-autonomous power structure. The Ottomans faced repeated challenges in maintaining control, while plagues and famines weakened the economy and civil society. Between 1687 and 1731, Egypt experienced six major famines, including the 1784 famine that killed roughly one-sixth of the population.

In 1798, Napoleon Bonaparte invaded Egypt, defeating the Mamluks at the Battle of the Pyramids. The French occupation was short-lived, but it destabilised the region and set the stage for Muhammad Ali Pasha's rise. After the French were expelled, power struggles ensued between the Ottomans, the Mamluks, and Albanian mercenaries in Ottoman service, leaving Egypt politically fragmented.

In 1805, Muhammad Ali Pasha seized power, massacring the remaining Mamluks and establishing a dynasty that would rule Egypt until 1952. He reorganised the army along European lines, introduced conscription, and developed a centralised administration. At the same time, he promoted cash-crop agriculture, especially long-staple cotton, to integrate Egypt into global markets. His successors, including Ibrahim Pasha, Abbas I, Sa'id, and Isma'il Pasha, continued reforms in agriculture, science, and industry, and abolished slavery.

Muhammad Ali expanded Egypt's control over Northern Sudan (1820–1824), Syria (1833), and parts of Arabia and Anatolia, but European powers intervened in 1841, forcing him to relinquish most of his conquests. He modernised Egypt's infrastructure, built factories and irrigation networks, and strengthened the military, while broader education remained largely limited to military and technical training. The centralisation of power and focus on military and economic modernisation laid the foundation for Egypt's transformation into a regional power.

=== Monarchical Egypt (1867–1952) ===
In 1867, Egypt was formally granted autonomous status as a vassal state of the Ottoman Empire. The Suez Canal, completed in 1869 with French assistance, became a key strategic and commercial asset. Financial mismanagement and mounting debts led Isma'il Pasha to sell Egypt's shares in the canal to Britain in 1875, increasing European influence. Rising discontent culminated in the Urabi revolt, after which Britain occupied Egypt in 1882, establishing a de facto protectorate while maintaining nominal Ottoman sovereignty. The Anglo-Egyptian Condominium Agreement of 1899 placed Sudan under joint Egyptian and British administration, though Britain retained real control. Incidents such as the Denshawai incident in 1906 intensified nationalist sentiment, laying the groundwork for political movements that challenged both Ottoman and European dominance.

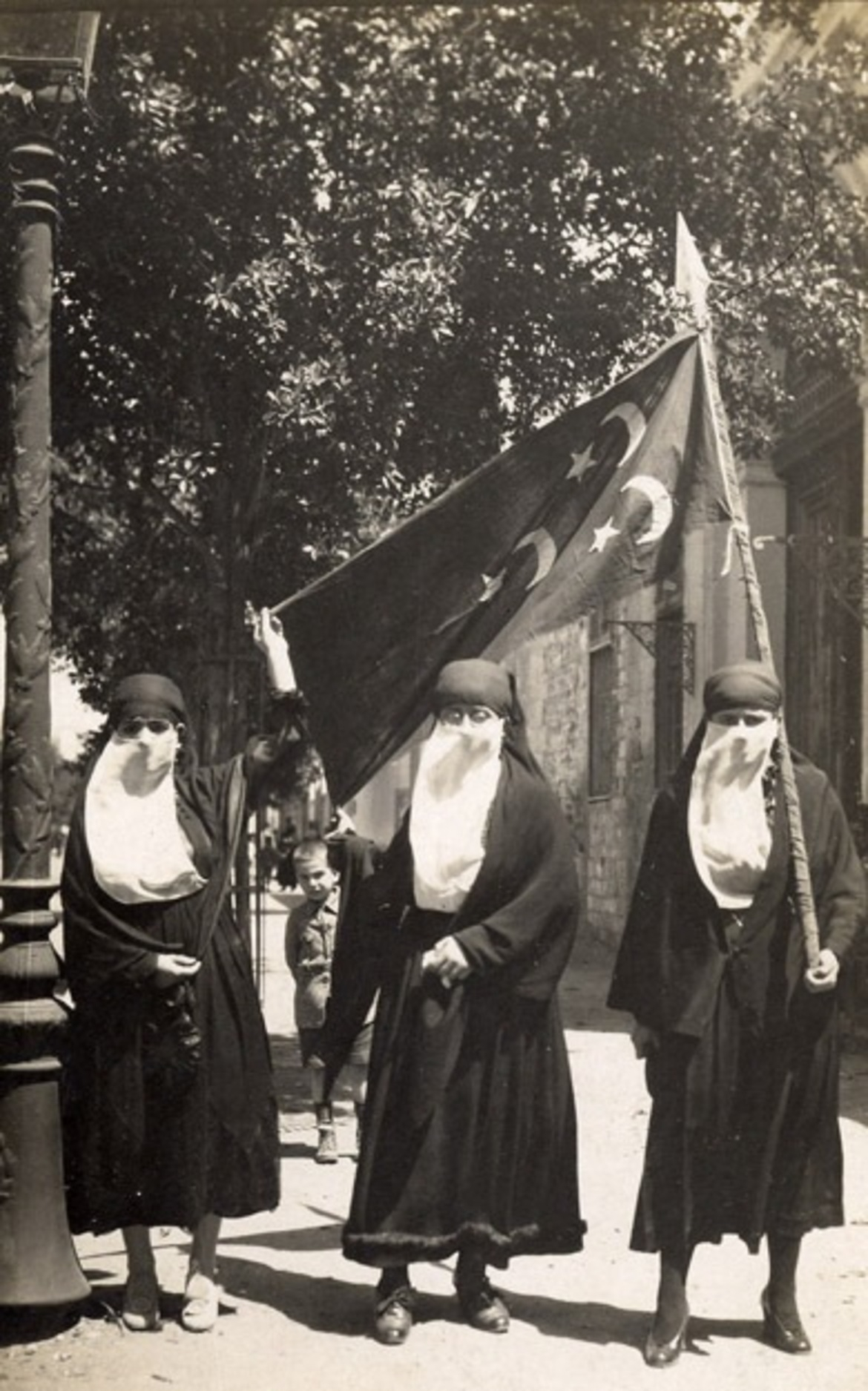
Female nationalists demonstrating in Cairo during the 1919 revolution, 1919

In 1914, as the Ottoman Empire joined World War I alongside the Central Powers, Khedive Abbas II declared support for the Ottoman side. In response, the British deposed him and installed his brother Hussein Kamel, who assumed the title of Sultan of Egypt. Egypt was formally declared independent from the Ottoman Empire but remained under British protection.

After World War I, nationalist sentiments surged. Saad Zaghloul and the Wafd Party secured popular support, but the British exiled Zaghloul and his colleagues to Malta on 8 March 1919, prompting the first modern revolution. This uprising pressured the UK to issue a declaration of independence on 22 February 1922. Sultan Fuad I then assumed the title of King of Egypt. Despite nominal independence, Britain retained military presence and political influence.

In 1923, a new constitution established a parliamentary government. The Wafd Party won a decisive victory in the 1923–24 elections, with Saad Zaghloul becoming prime minister. The 1936 treaty led to British troop withdrawal from most of Egypt, except the Suez Canal. The treaty left the status of Sudan unresolved, as real control remained with Britain.

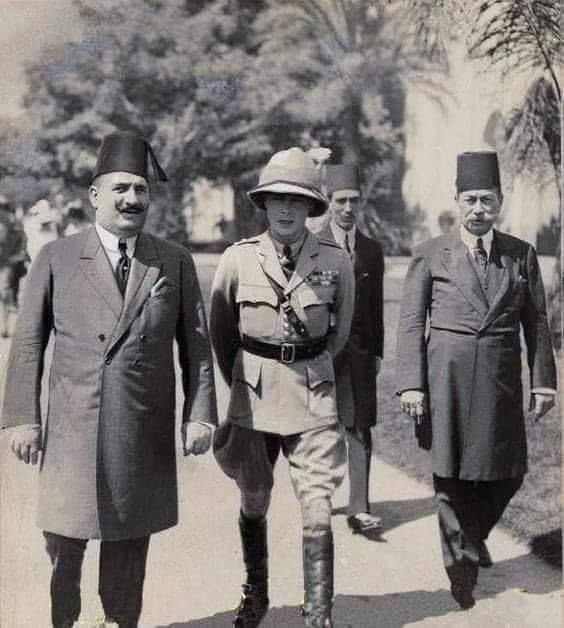
Fuad I of Egypt with Edward, Prince of Wales, 1932

During World War II, Egypt served as a strategic base for Allied operations, particularly in North Africa. Although Egypt declared martial law and severed diplomatic relations with Axis powers, the Egyptian army did not engage directly. Political tensions persisted, highlighted by the 1942 Abdeen Palace Incident, in which British forces pressured King Farouk to install a Wafd-coalition government.

After the war, nationalist and anti-British sentiments intensified. British troops largely withdrew in 1947, leaving a residual presence around the Suez Canal. Egypt's defeat in the First Arab-Israeli War fuelled anti-monarchy feeling. The Wafd Party's 1950 election victory forced King Farouk to appoint Mostafa El-Nahas as prime minister. In 1951, Egypt unilaterally renounced the 1936 treaty and demanded British troop withdrawal. The situation around the Suez Canal escalated, culminating in violent confrontations that led to the killing of 43 Egyptian policemen in 1952 by British troops. The Ismailia incident outraged Egypt and led to the subsequent Black Saturday anti-British riots, which saw widespread destruction in Cairo.

These events precipitated the Free Officers Movement coup on 22–23 July 1952, led by Muhammad Naguib and Gamal Abdel Nasser. King Farouk abdicated in favour of his infant son, Fuad II, but real power rested with the Egyptian Revolutionary Command Council. By 18 June 1953, the monarchy was formally abolished, the 1923 constitution suspended, and Egypt was declared a republic, with Naguib as president and Nasser as prime minister.

=== Republican Egypt under Nasser (1952–1970) ===
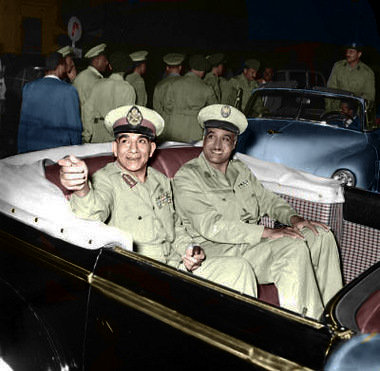
Gamal Abdel Nasser (right) and Mohamed Naguib (left) during celebrations marking the second anniversary of the 1952 Egyptian revolution, July 1954

Following the 1952 Revolution led by the Free Officers Movement, Egypt came under military control, and all political parties were banned. On 18 June 1953, the Republic of Egypt was officially declared, with Muhammad Naguib serving as the first President. His presidency lasted less than a year and a half, as Gamal Abdel Nasser, a Pan-Arabist and the principal architect of the 1952 movement, gradually consolidated power. Naguib was forced to resign in 1954 and placed under house arrest. The presidency remained vacant until Nasser was formally elected in 1956.

In October 1954, Egypt and the United Kingdom agreed to end the Anglo-Egyptian Condominium Agreement of 1899, granting Sudan full independence, which came into effect on 1 January 1956. In June 1956, Nasser assumed the presidency and immediately became the central figure in Egypt's domestic and foreign policy. British forces completed their withdrawal from the Suez Canal Zone on 13 June 1956. Later that year, on 26 July, Nasser nationalised the Suez Canal, provoking the Suez Crisis when Israel, with support from France and the United Kingdom, invaded the Sinai Peninsula and targeted the Canal. The conflict ended following diplomatic pressure from the United States and the Soviet Union, restoring the pre-war status quo.

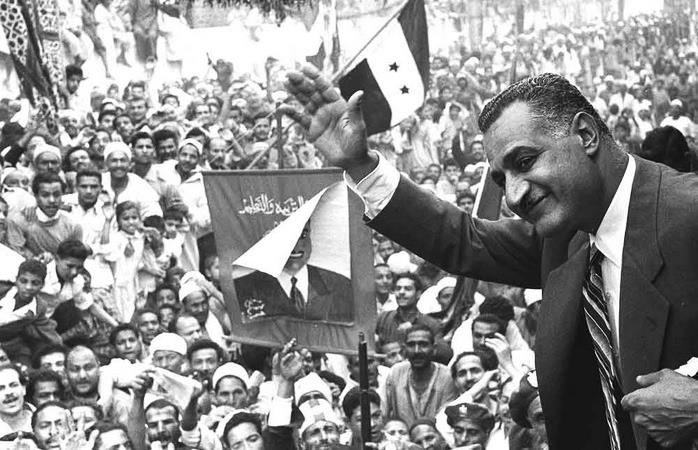
Egyptian President Gamal Abdel Nasser in Mansoura, 1960

In 1958, Egypt formed a political union with Syria, creating the United Arab Republic. The union, also loosely connected with North Yemen in the United Arab States, was short-lived; Syria seceded in 1961. During this period, Egypt became heavily involved in the North Yemen Civil War, with military interventions and peace conferences ultimately leading to a prolonged stalemate. In May 1967, tensions with Israel escalated after warnings from the Soviet Union, deployment of Egyptian forces to Sinai, expulsion of UN peacekeepers, and closure of the Straits of Tiran. These measures precipitated the Six-Day War, during which Israel captured the Sinai Peninsula and the Gaza Strip. In response to the conflict, an Emergency Law was enacted, greatly expanding police powers, restricting constitutional rights, and legalising censorship; it remained in force until 2012, except for a brief break in 1980–81.

Socially and economically, Nasser's policies transformed Egypt. At the time of the monarchy's fall, less than half a million Egyptians were considered upper class, four million were middle class, and seventeen million were lower class or poor. Education was expanded, with school enrolment more than doubling from 1953 to 1966. Land reforms, industrial support, and growth in public-sector employment created a larger middle class, including doctors, engineers, teachers, lawyers, and journalists. However, by the late 1960s, the Egyptian economy faced stagnation, political freedoms had declined, and Nasser's personal popularity began to wane.

=== Egypt under Sadat and Mubarak (1970–2011) ===
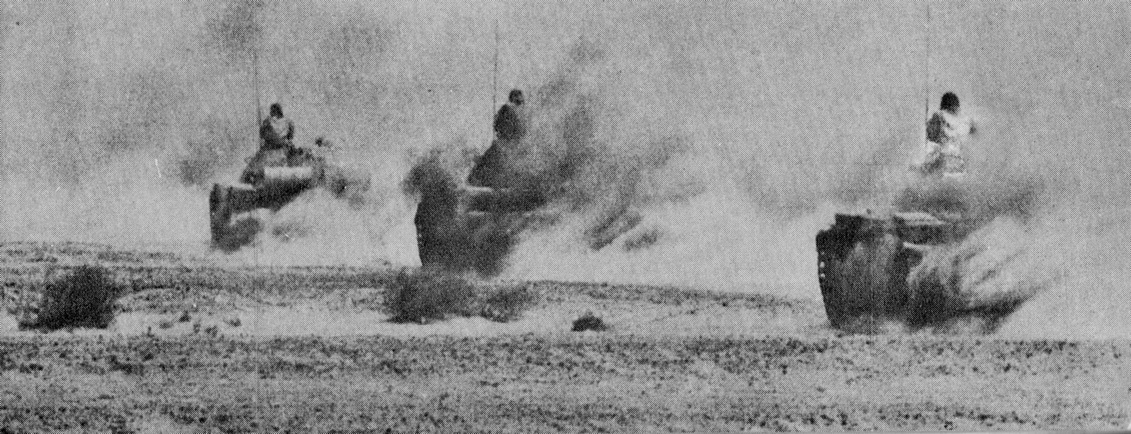
Egyptian vehicles advancing in the Sinai Peninsula during the Yom Kippur War, 1973

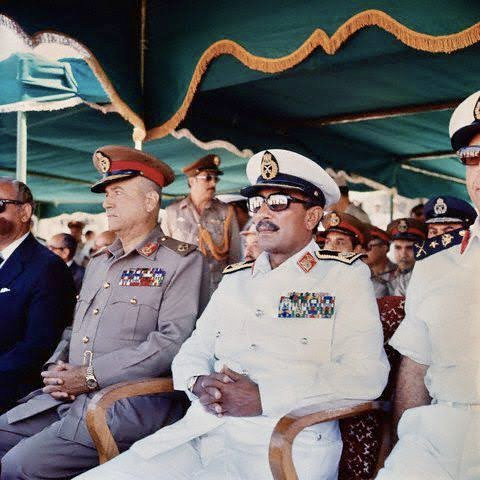
Egyptian President Anwar Sadat and Minister of War Ahmad Ismail Ali attending the re-opening ceremony of Suez Canal after the Yom Kippur war, 1975

After the death of Gamal Abdel Nasser in 1970, Anwar Sadat assumed the presidency of Egypt. Sadat consolidated his power by marginalising Nasserist and leftist factions, while controlling opposition both secular and religious. He shifted Egypt's Cold War alignment from the Soviet Union to the United States, expelling Soviet advisors in 1972, and renamed the country the Arab Republic of Egypt in 1971. Sadat launched the Infitah ("open door") economic reforms. Some measures of this economic liberalisation caused social tensions, most notably the removal of food subsidies in 1977 which sparked widespread bread riots.

In 1973, Sadat coordinated with Syria in the Fourth Arab-Israeli War to reclaim the Sinai Peninsula from Israeli occupation. Though militarily mixed, the war restored Arab morale and strengthened Sadat's domestic legitimacy. His historic 1977 visit to Jerusalem led to the 1979 Egypt-Israel peace treaty, with Israel withdrawing from Sinai and Egypt recognising Israel as a sovereign state. This initiative provoked widespread controversy across the Arab world, resulting in Egypt's temporary expulsion from the Arab League, but remained popular domestically. Sadat was assassinated in 1981 by an Islamic extremist opposed to his domestic policies and peace initiative.

Hosni Mubarak succeeded Sadat in a 1981 referendum in which he was the sole candidate. He maintained Egypt's peace treaty with Israel and improved relations with Arab neighbours. Domestically, he faced widespread poverty, high unemployment, and urban overcrowding. The 1986 Security Police riots, sparked by reports of extended military service, led to violent protests, destruction of businesses, and 107 deaths.

Terrorist attacks, particularly by Islamist groups like Al-Gama'a al-Islamiyya, targeted government officials, foreigners, and Christian Copts, devastating tourism, Egypt's primary source of hard currency. The political scene was dominated by the NDP, which curtailed freedoms of association, expression, and political participation through laws such as the 1993 Syndicates Law, 1995 Press Law, and 1999 NGOs Law.

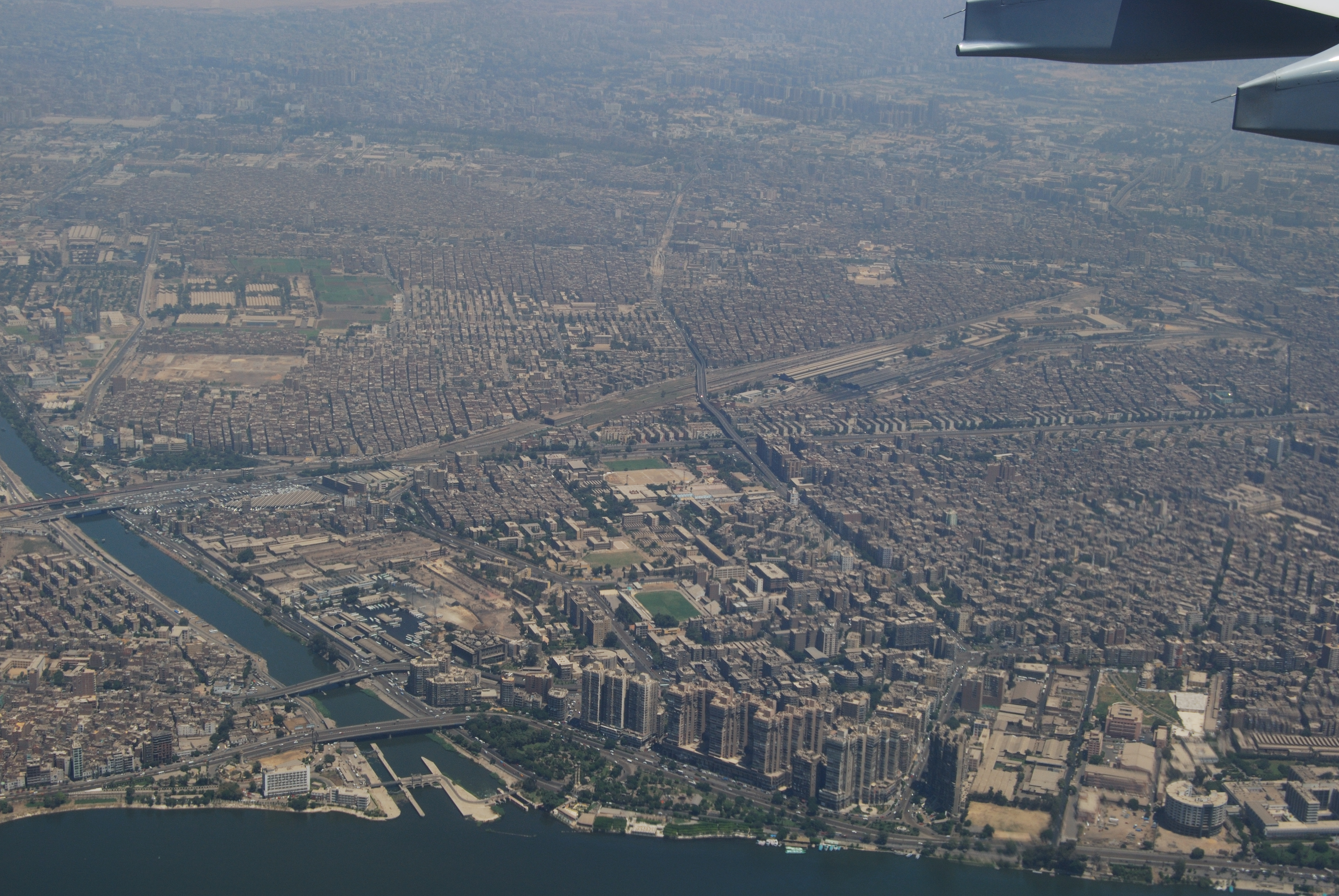
Cairo grew into a metropolitan area with a population of over 22 million.

In 1997, the Luxor massacre left 62 dead, mostly tourists. Security and the economy remained under threat. In 2005, limited reforms allowed multi-candidate presidential elections, but restrictions on candidates and alleged government interference ensured Mubarak's easy reelection. Voter turnout was less than 25%, and opposition leader Ayman Nour was subsequently imprisoned.

Human Rights Watch and Amnesty International reported widespread human rights abuses, including torture, arbitrary detention, and the use of Egypt as an international "torture hub" in the context of the war on terror. Constitutional changes in 2007 further expanded presidential powers, restricted religious parties, and broadened police authority. Egypt remained under strong military influence, described by officials as a "pharaonic" system, with democracy as a distant aspiration.

=== Contemporary (2011–present) ===
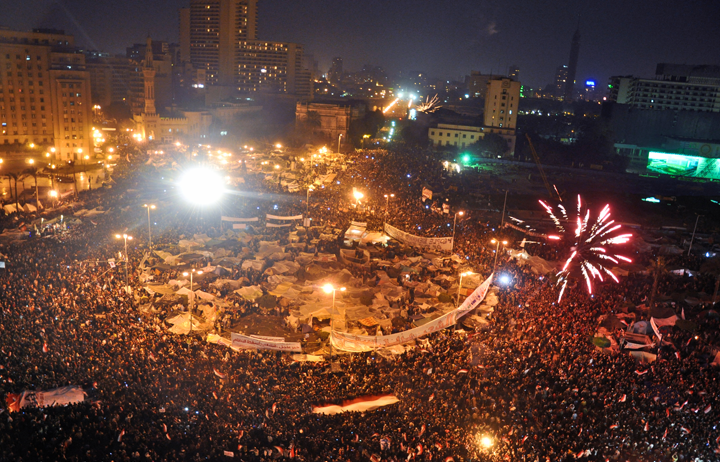
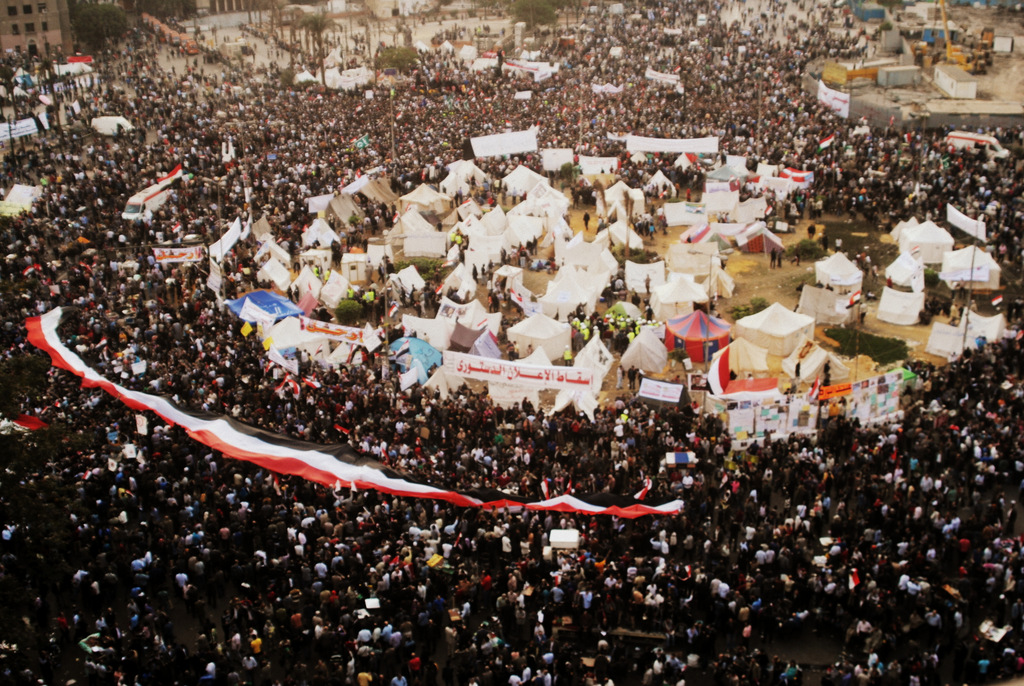
Top: Celebrations in Tahrir Square after the announcement of Hosni Mubarak's resignation, 2011.
Bottom: Protests in Tahrir Square against Morsi, 2012.

On 25 January 2011, widespread protests erupted against President Hosni Mubarak's government, triggered by demands for political freedom, social justice, and the end of long-standing corruption. Demonstrations rapidly spread across major cities, particularly in Cairo's Tahrir Square, capturing global attention. After 18 days of escalating unrest, Mubarak resigned on 11 February 2011 and fled Cairo. The Egyptian military assumed control, with Mohamed Hussein Tantawi, chairman of the Supreme Council of the Armed Forces, acting as interim head of state. On 13 February, the military dissolved parliament and suspended the constitution. A constitutional referendum followed on 19 March 2011. Later that year, Egypt held its first parliamentary elections since the previous regime, with high voter turnout and no major reported irregularities.

Mohamed Morsi, affiliated with the Muslim Brotherhood, won the presidency on 24 June 2012 and was sworn in on 30 June. His cabinet, announced in August 2012, included significant representation from the Muslim Brotherhood, prompting liberal and secular groups to withdraw from the Constituent Assembly of Egypt over concerns of imposing strict Islamic law. In November 2012, Morsi issued a decree granting immunity to his decisions and protecting the constituent assembly's work, sparking mass protests and violent clashes across the country. Tensions escalated, with the largest confrontations between Islamist supporters and opponents since the 2011 revolution occurring on 5 December 2012. Morsi refused to cancel the December 2012 constitutional referendum.

Following growing public discontent, the military removed Morsi on 3 July 2013, dissolved the Shura Council, and installed Adly Mansour, chief justice of the Supreme Constitutional Court, as interim president. Authorities cracked down on the Muslim Brotherhood, jailing thousands and conducting mass trials. Violence during dispersals of pro-Morsi camps left hundreds dead. A new constitution was approved by referendum on 18 January 2014 with 98.1% voting in favour.

Abdel Fattah el-Sisi won the presidential elections in June 2014 with 96.1% of the vote and was sworn in on 8 June. Under his rule, Egypt intensified security on the Gaza border, dismantled tunnels between Sinai and Gaza, and consolidated political power. Presidential terms were extended to six years in 2019, allowing El-Sisi to run for a third term in 2024. Parliamentary elections in 2020 confirmed a pro-El-Sisi majority for the Mostaqbal Watan Party. The constitutional reforms and strengthened military authority under El-Sisi have been described as a return to authoritarianism. In December 2023, El-Sisi won the elections that gave him a third six-year term.

== Geography ==
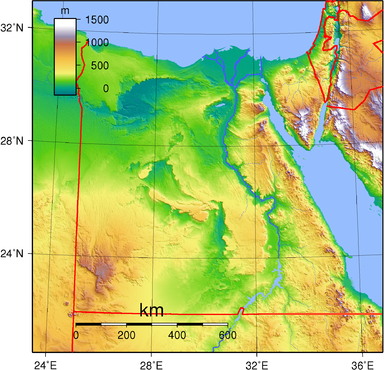
Egypt's topography

Egypt lies primarily between latitudes 22° and 32°N, and longitudes 25° and 35°E. At 1,001,450 square kilometres (386,660 sq mi), it is the world's 29th largest country. Due to the extreme aridity of Egypt's climate, population centres are concentrated along the narrow Nile Valley and Delta, meaning that about 99% of the population uses about 5.5% of the total land area. 98% of Egyptians live on 3% of the territory.

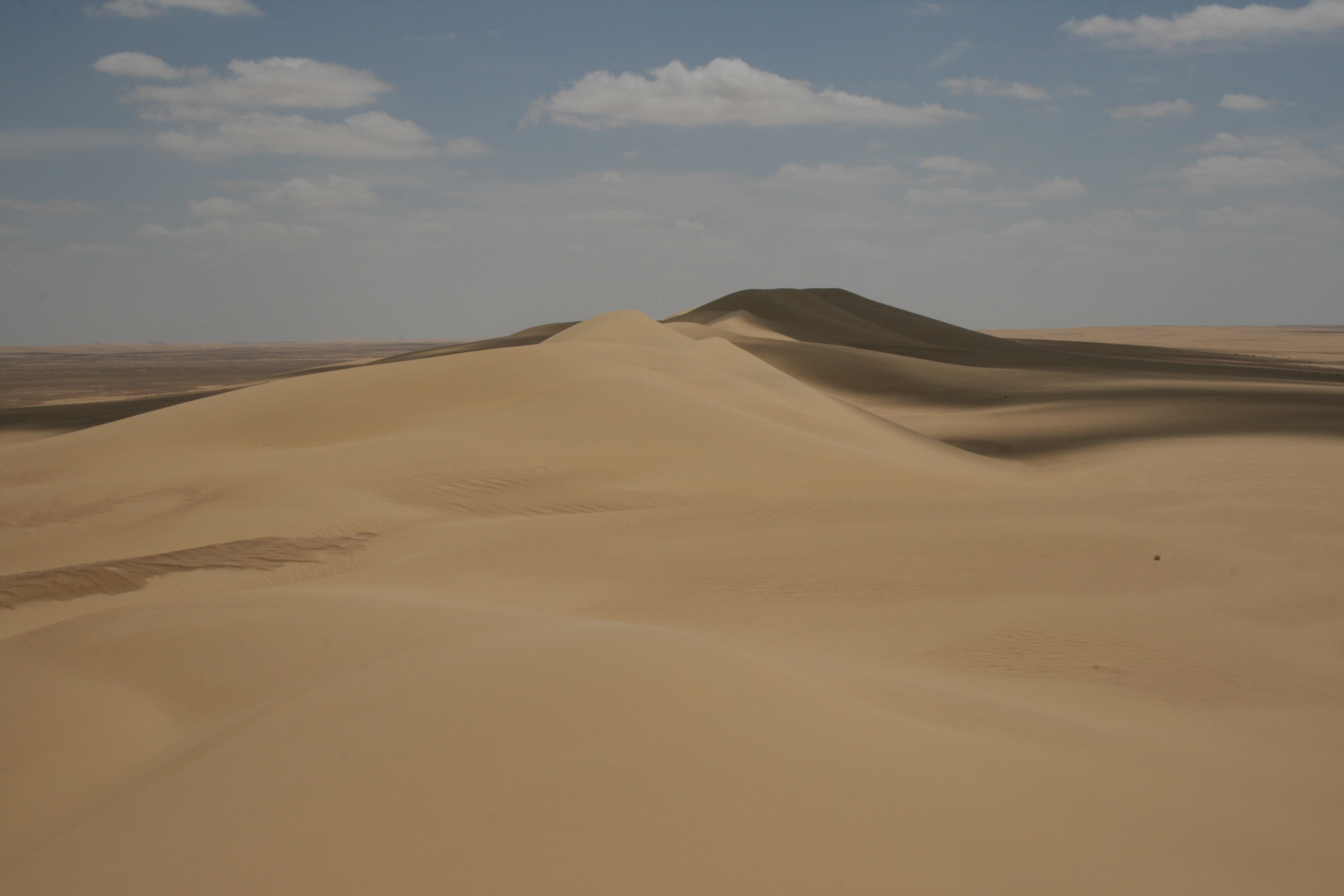
The Qattara Depression in Egypt's north west

Egypt is bordered by Libya to the west, the Sudan to the south, and the Gaza Strip and Israel to the east. A transcontinental nation, it possesses a land bridge (the Isthmus of Suez) between Africa and Asia, traversed by a navigable waterway (the Suez Canal) that connects the Mediterranean Sea with the Indian Ocean by way of the Red Sea.

Apart from the Nile Valley, the majority of Egypt's landscape is desert, with a few oases scattered about. Winds create prolific sand dunes that peak at more than 30 metres (100 ft) high. Egypt includes parts of the Sahara desert and of the Libyan Desert.

Sinai peninsula hosts the highest mountain in Egypt, Mount Catherine at 2,642 metres. The Red Sea Riviera, on the east of the peninsula, is renowned for its wealth of coral reefs and marine life.

Towns and cities include Alexandria, the second largest city; Aswan; Asyut; Cairo, the modern Egyptian capital and largest city; El Mahalla El Kubra; Giza, the site of the Pyramid of Khufu; Hurghada; Luxor; Kom Ombo; Port Safaga; Port Said; Sharm El Sheikh; Suez, where the south end of the Suez Canal is located; Zagazig; and Minya. Oases include Bahariya, Dakhla, Farafra, Kharga and Siwa. Protectorates include Ras Mohamed National Park, Zaranik Protectorate and Siwa.

On 13 March 2015, plans for a proposed new capital of Egypt were announced.

=== Climate ===
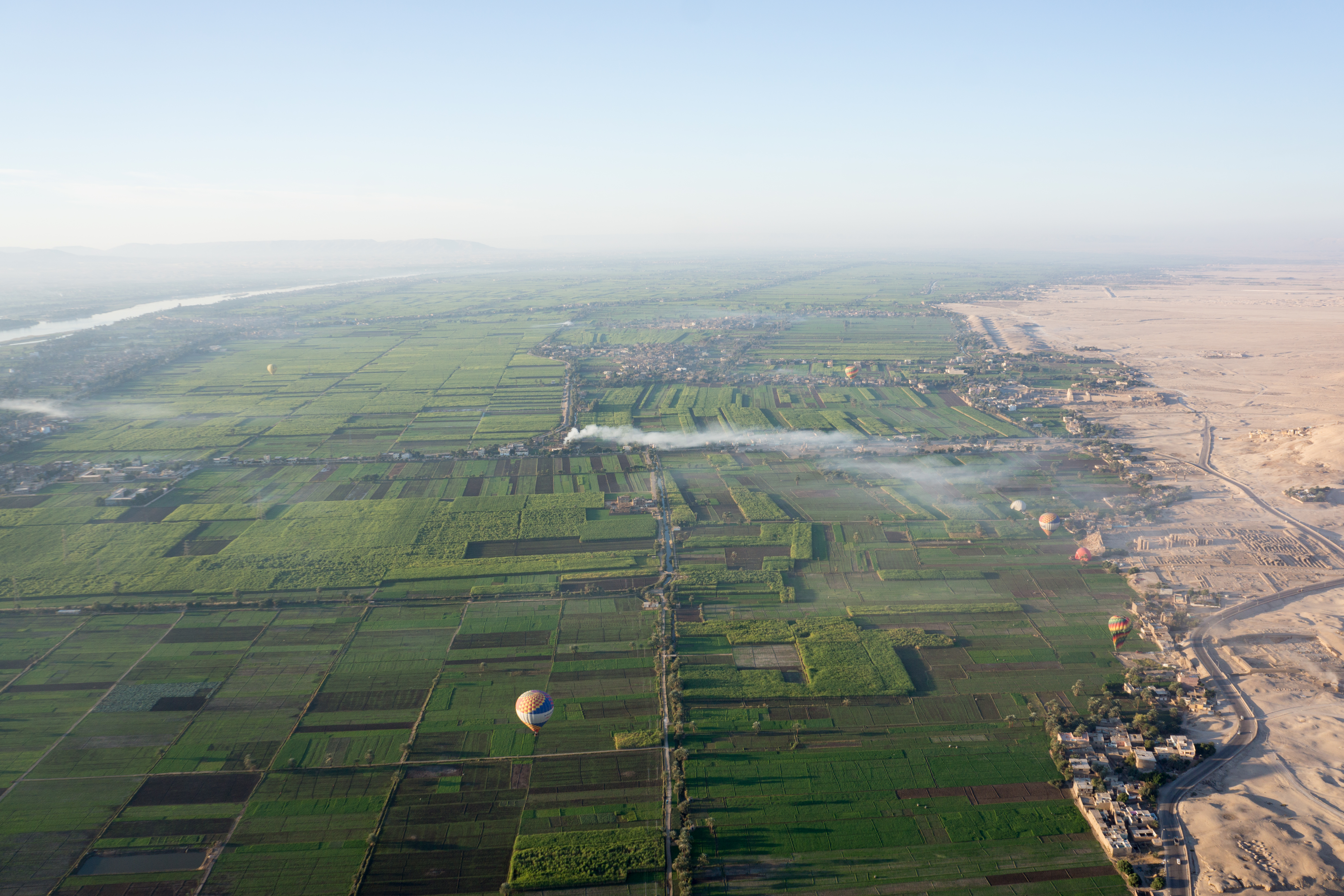
The sharp boundary between the hyper-arid desert and the irrigated Nile Valley, where most of Egypt's population and agriculture are concentrated.

Most of Egypt's rain falls in the winter months. South of Cairo, rainfall averages only around 2 to 5 mm (0.1 to 0.2 in) per year and at intervals of many years. On a very thin strip of the northern coast the rainfall can be as high as 410 mm (16.1 in), mostly between October and March. Snow falls on Sinai's mountains and some of the north coastal cities such as Damietta, Baltim and Sidi Barrani, and rarely in Alexandria. A very small amount of snow fell on Cairo on 13 December 2013, the first time in many decades. Frost is also known in mid-Sinai and mid-Egypt.

Egypt has a very hot, sunny and dry climate. Average temperature highs are very high to extremely high throughout most of the country. The exception to this is the northern part of the country, which, although still hot, has its temperatures moderated by the cool Mediterranean winds consistently blowing in over the sea coast, especially at the height of summer. The Khamaseen is a hot, dry wind that originates from the vast deserts in the south and blows in the spring or in the early summer. It brings scorching sand and dust particles, and usually brings daytime temperatures over 40 °C (104 °F) and sometimes over 50 °C (122 °F) in the interior, while the relative humidity can drop to 5% or even less.

Prior to the construction of the Aswan Dam, the Nile flooded annually, replenishing Egypt's soil. This gave Egypt a consistent harvest throughout the years.

Egypt's hot and arid climate is under increasing strain from climate change, which has brought extreme temperatures, droughts, floods, and rising sea levels. Egypt is highly vulnerable, and these shifts threaten food security, water availability, public health, and economic stability.

=== Biodiversity ===
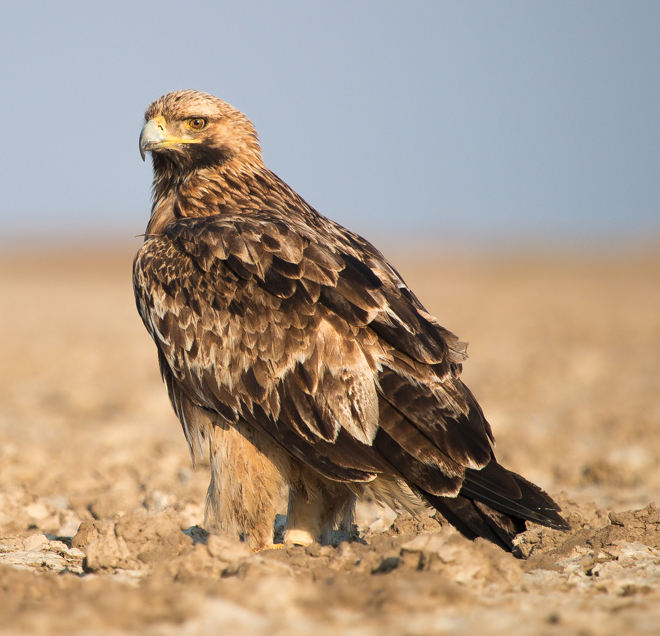
The Eastern Imperial Eagle is the national animal of Egypt.

Egypt signed the Rio Convention on Biological Diversity on 9 June 1992, and became a party to the convention on 2 June 1994. It produced a National Biodiversity Strategy and Action Plan which was received by the convention on 31 July 1998.

The plan stated that the following numbers of species of different groups had been recorded from Egypt: algae (1483 species), animals (about 15,000 species of which more than 10,000 were insects), fungi (more than 627 species), monera (319 species), plants (2426 species), protozoans (371 species). For some major groups, for example lichen-forming fungi and nematode worms, the number was not known. Apart from small and well-studied groups like amphibians, birds, fish, mammals and reptiles, the many of those numbers are likely to increase as further species are recorded from Egypt. For the fungi, including lichen-forming species, for example, subsequent work has shown that over 2200 species have been recorded from Egypt, and the final figure of all fungi actually occurring in the country is expected to be much higher. For the grasses, 284 native and naturalised species have been identified and recorded in Egypt.

== Government ==
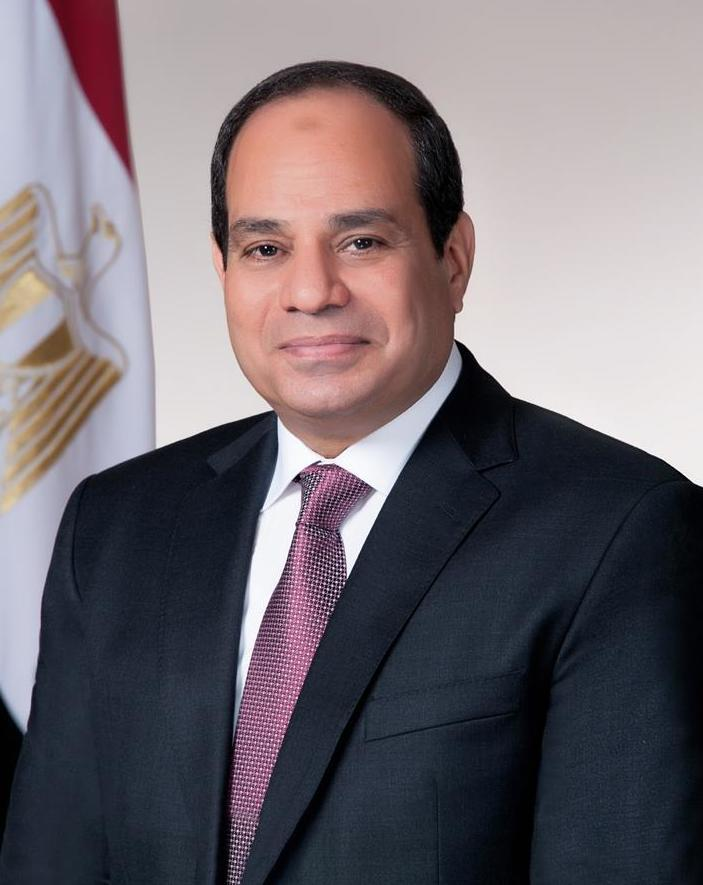
Abdel Fattah el-Sisi
President

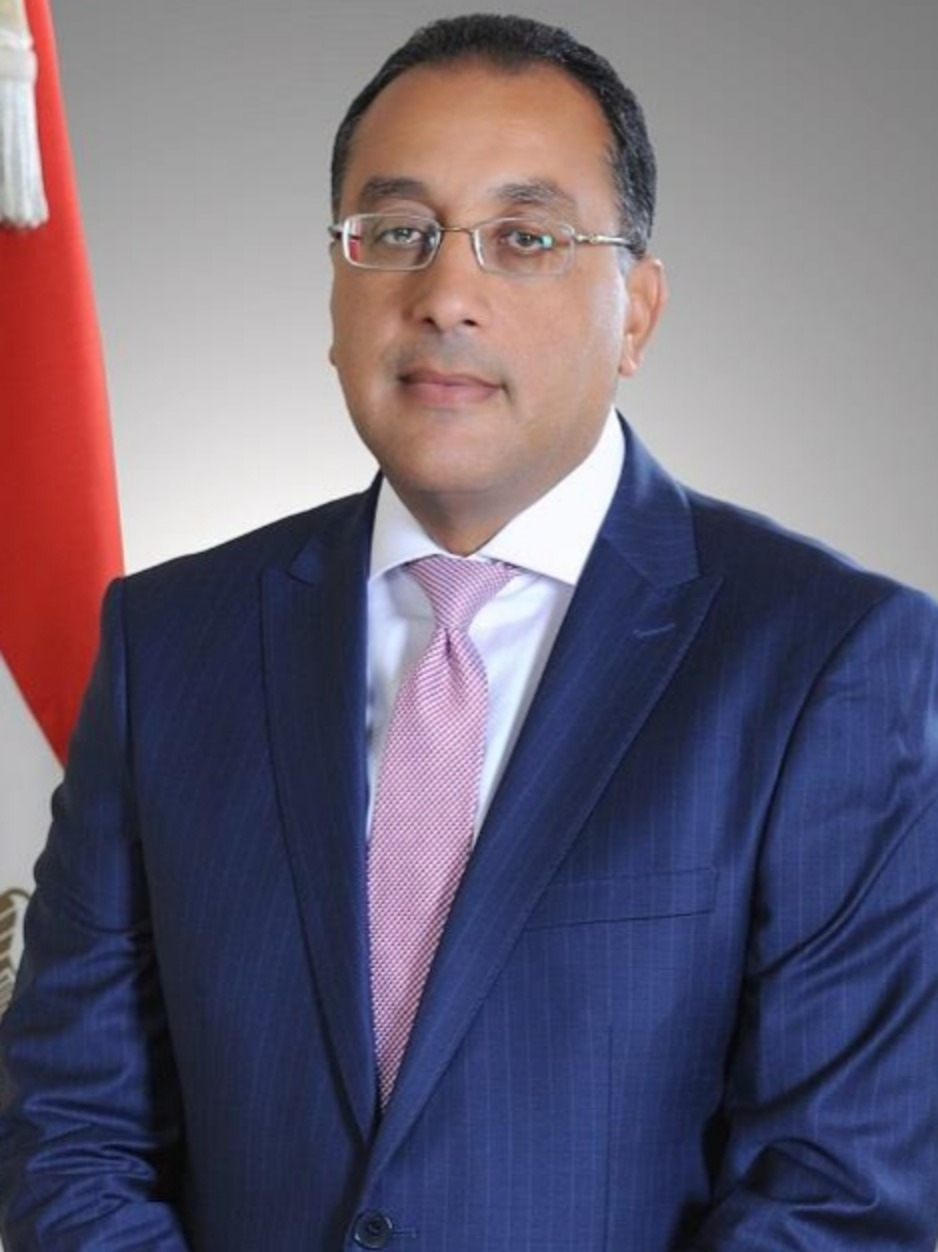
Mostafa Madbouly
Prime Minister

The House of Representatives, whose members are elected to serve five-year terms, specialises in legislation. Elections were held between November 2011 and January 2012, which were later dissolved.

After a wave of public discontent with the Muslim Brotherhood government of President Mohamed Morsi, on 3 July 2013 then-General Abdel Fattah el-Sisi announced the removal of Morsi from office and the suspension of the constitution. A 50-member constitution committee was formed for modifying the constitution which was later published for public voting and was adopted on 18 January 2014.

The next parliamentary election was announced to be held within 6 months of the constitution's ratification on 18 January 2014, and were held in two phases, from 17 October to 2 December 2015. Originally, the parliament was to be formed before the president was elected, but interim president Adly Mansour pushed the date. The 2014 Egyptian presidential election took place on 26–28 May. Official figures showed a turnout of 25,578,233 or 47.5%, with Abdel Fattah el-Sisi winning with 23.78 million votes, or 96.9% compared to 757,511 (3.1%) for Hamdeen Sabahi.

In 2024, as part of its Freedom in the World report, Freedom House rated political rights in Egypt at 6 (with 40 representing the most free and 0 the least), and civil liberties at 12 (with 60 being the highest score and 0 the lowest), which gave it the freedom rating of "Not Free". According to the 2023 V-Dem Democracy indices Egypt is the eighth least democratic country in Africa. The 2023 edition of The Economist Democracy Index categorises Egypt as an "authoritarian regime", with a score of 2.93.

Egypt has the oldest continuous parliamentary tradition in the Arab world. The first popular assembly was established in 1866. It was disbanded as a result of the British occupation of 1882, and the British allowed only a consultative body to sit. In 1923, however, after the country's independence was declared, a new constitution provided for a parliamentary monarchy.

=== Foreign relations ===
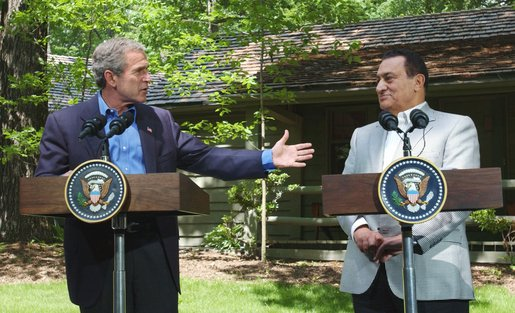
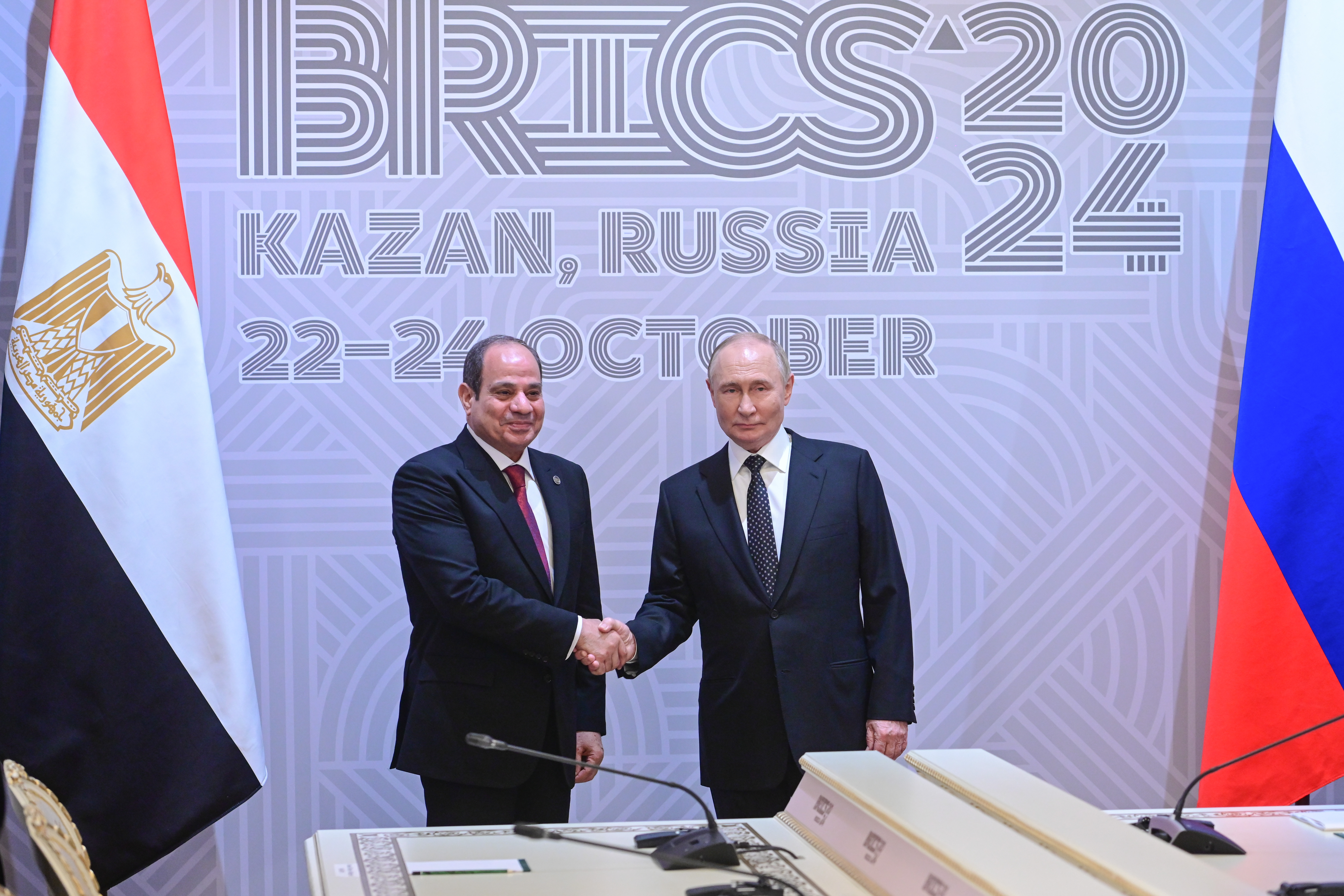
Top: Former President Hosni Mubarak with former US President George W. Bush at Camp David in 2002.
Bottom: President Abdel Fattah el-Sisi and Russian President Vladimir Putin at the 16th BRICS Summit in 2024

Egypt's foreign policy is shaped by its strategic geographical position, historical legacy, and diplomatic influence in Africa, the Mediterranean, and Southwest Asia. As a founding member of the Non-Aligned Movement and the United Nations, Egypt has maintained a non-aligned stance while remaining active in regional diplomacy. Cairo, historically a crossroads of commerce and culture, remains a centre of intellectual and political influence in the region.

The United States has been a key partner, providing Egypt with US$1.3 billion in annual military assistance as of 2015. In 1989, Egypt was designated a major non-NATO ally, but relations soured following the 2013 Egyptian coup d'état, as the Obama administration criticised Egypt's crackdown on the Muslim Brotherhood and suspended joint military exercises. Under President Donald Trump, relations improved, with Abdel Fattah el-Sisi's 2017 visit to the White House marking the first by an Egyptian president in eight years.

Relations with Russia strengthened after Morsi's removal, with both nations expanding military cooperation and trade relations. Similarly, relations with China have deepened, culminating in the establishment of a "comprehensive strategic partnership" in 2014.

In 2024, Egypt and the European Union elevated their relationship to a "strategic and comprehensive partnership", emphasising political cooperation, and economic collaboration. Both sides are also working on deepening trade relations under the Association Agreement, supporting Egypt's economic stability, and strengthening counterterrorism efforts.

Egypt remains an influential mediator in Middle Eastern conflicts, particularly in brokering ceasefires in Gaza and facilitating the Israeli–Palestinian peace process. It is also a Member State of the African Union and the Arab League, hosting the Arab League headquarters in Cairo. The Arab League temporarily moved to Tunis in 1978 in protest of the Egypt–Israel peace treaty, but returned to Cairo in 1989. Egypt has also cultivated strong economic ties with Gulf nations such as Saudi Arabia and the United Arab Emirates, both of which have provided billions of dollars in financial assistance.

=== Military ===
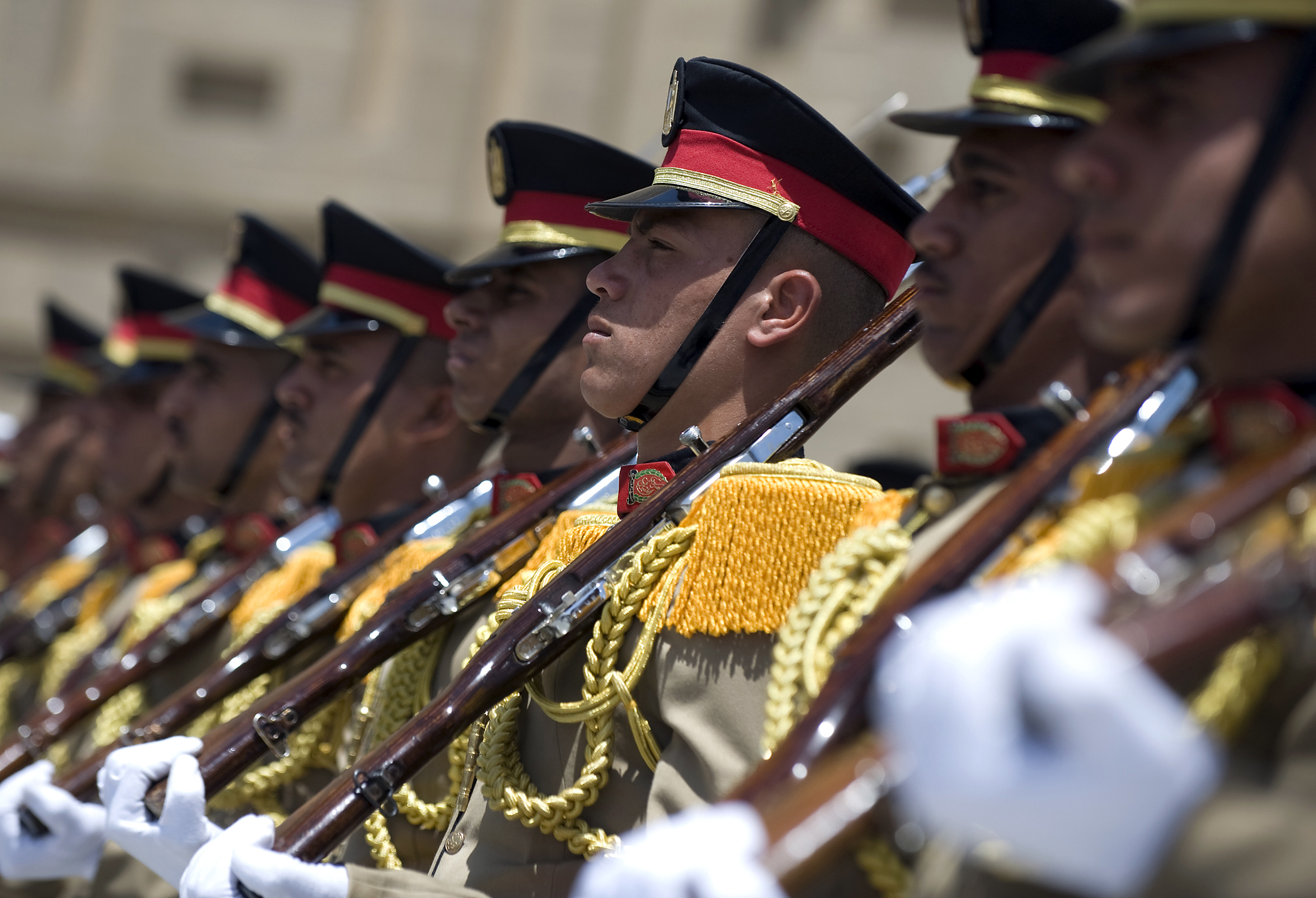
Egyptian honour guard soldiers in 2009

The Egyptian Armed Forces constitute Egypt's military establishment, comprising the Egyptian Army, Navy, Air Force, and Air Defence Forces under the direct supervision of the Chief of Staff, with their headquarters at the State Strategic Command Center, commonly known as the Octagon, in the New Administrative Capital. The military primarily oversees external defence but also plays a domestic role, assisting police in protecting vital infrastructure during emergencies and counterterrorism operations. They also participate in foreign peacekeeping missions and engage in bilateral and multinational military exercises.

The military wields significant political influence, operating autonomously and remaining exempt from many civilian laws. A significant amount of military information is not made publicly available, including budget information, the names of the general officers and the military's size (which is considered a state secret). In addition, the military is a major driver of Egypt's economic landscape, engaging in infrastructure development, consumer goods production, and real estate holdings through the National Service Projects Organization.

With an active personnel strength of 438,500 and 479,000 reservists, it is one of the largest and best-equipped militaries in the region. Conscription is mandatory for men aged 18–30, with service obligations ranging from 14 to 36 months, depending on educational level, followed by a nine-year reserve duty. Voluntary enlistment is possible from age 16 for men and 17 for women.

The military operates a diverse arsenal sourced primarily from China, France, Germany, Italy, Russia, and the United States. Recent efforts have focused on modernisation and procurement of advanced weaponry. The domestic defence industry is also well-established, manufacturing small arms, armoured vehicles, and naval vessels, while maintaining licensed production agreements with countries such as Germany and the United States.

Egypt is one of few countries in the region to possess spy satellites, launching EgyptSat 1 in 2007, followed by EgyptSat 2 in 2014. In 2019, Egypt launched MisrSat-A, an observation satellite, followed later that year by Tiba-1, a civilian and military communications satellite. In 2023, Egypt launched Horus-1 and Horus-2, about a month apart. The country also placed MisrSat-2 into orbit later that year. All three of them are high-resolution observation satellites. In 2024, two months after MisrSat-2's launch, the country successfully completed the initial operational phase of NEXSAT-1, its first experimental Earth observation satellite, achieving milestones such as developing indigenous onboard software, advanced attitude-control systems, and independently capturing and processing satellite imagery, all of which marked a major step forward in Egypt's national space capabilities.

=== Law ===
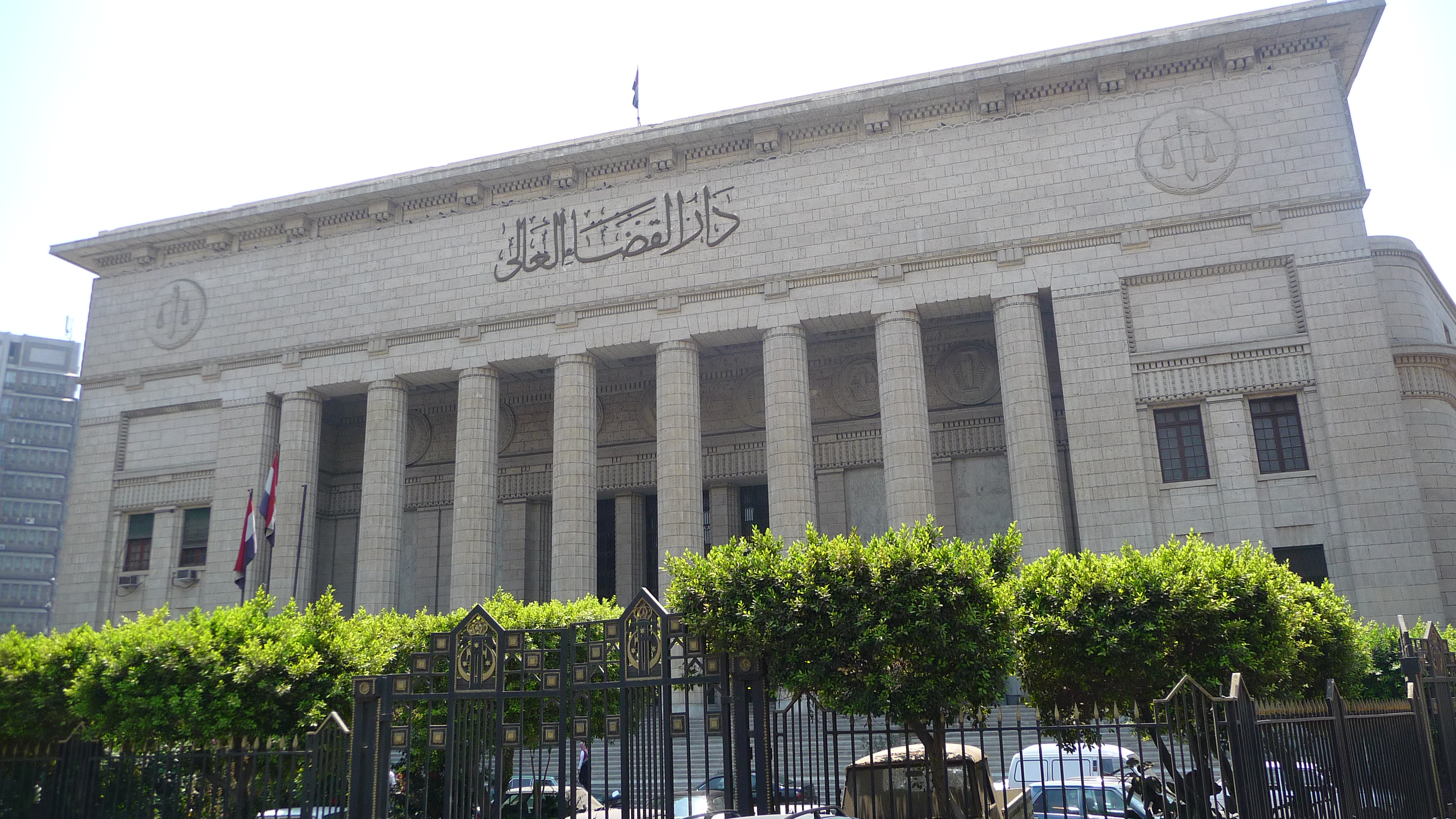
The High Court of Justice in Downtown Cairo

The legal system is based on Islamic and civil law (particularly the Napoleonic Code); and judicial review by a Supreme Court, which accepts compulsory International Court of Justice jurisdiction only with reservations. The highest judicial authority of Egypt is the Supreme Constitutional Court, located in the Maadi district of Cairo.

Islamic jurisprudence is the principal source of legislation. Sharia courts and qadis are run and licensed by the Ministry of Justice. The personal status law that regulates matters such as marriage, divorce and child custody is governed by Sharia. In a family court, a woman's testimony is worth half of a man's testimony.

On 26 December 2012, the Muslim Brotherhood attempted to institutionalise a controversial new constitution. It was approved by the public in a referendum held 15–22 December 2012 with 64% support, but with only 33% electorate participation. It replaced the 2011 Provisional Constitution of Egypt, adopted following the revolution.

The Penal code was unique as it contains a "Blasphemy Law". The present court system allows a death penalty including against an absent individual tried in absentia. Several Americans and Canadians were sentenced to death in 2012.

On 18 January 2014, the interim government successfully institutionalised a more secular constitution. The president is elected to a four-year term and may serve 2 terms. The parliament may impeach the president. Under the constitution, there is a guarantee of gender equality and absolute freedom of thought. The military retains the ability to appoint the national Minister of Defence for the next two full presidential terms since the constitution took effect. Under the constitution, political parties may not be based on "religion, race, gender or geography".

==== Human rights ====
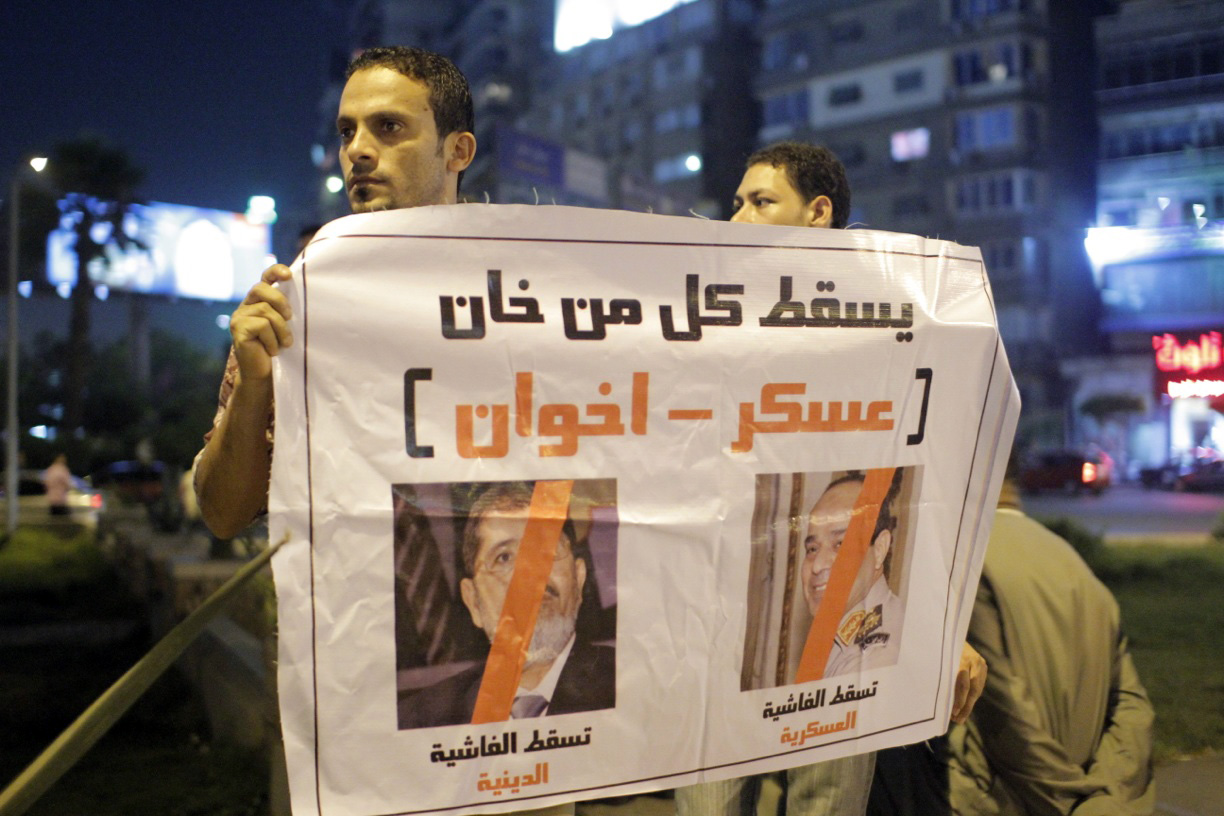
Protesters from the Third Square movement, which supported neither the former Morsi government nor the Armed Forces, 31 July 2013

The National Council for Human Rights was established in 2003, but it has faced criticism from activists who argue it serves as a government propaganda tool to justify human rights violations and repressive laws such as the Emergency Law.

Egypt has been ranked among the worst countries for religious freedom, with widespread discrimination against minorities such as Coptic Christians, Baháʼís, and other Muslim sects. A 2009 report by Pew Forum on Religion & Public Life ranked Egypt fifth worst globally for religious freedom, while the United States Commission on International Religious Freedom has placed Egypt on its watch list due to state-tolerated violations. A 2010 Pew survey found that 84% of Egyptians supported the death penalty for apostasy, 77% backed amputations for theft, and 82% endorsed stoning for adultery.

Since the 2013 Egyptian coup d'état, political repression has intensified, with mass arrests and harsh crackdowns on dissent. During the August 2013 sit-in dispersal, 595 protesters were killed, making 14 August 2013 the deadliest day in Egypt's modern history. Since then, an estimated 60,000 political prisoners remain behind bars.

Egypt has also drawn international condemnation for mass death sentences, including a 2014 ruling sentencing 529 people to death in a single hearing. The United Nations and human rights groups have condemned these trials as gross violations of international law.

Homosexuality remains de facto criminalised, with 95% of Egyptians opposing its acceptance, according to a 2013 Pew survey. A poll by the Thomson Reuters Foundation, based on assessments from specialists in women's rights, ranked Cairo as the worst megacity for women, evaluating cities on sexual harassment, healthcare access, harmful cultural practices, and economic opportunities.

==== Freedom of the press ====
Reporters Without Borders ranked Egypt in their 2017 World Press Freedom Index at No. 160 out of 180 nations. At least 18 journalists were imprisoned in Egypt, as of August 2015. A new anti-terror law was enacted in August 2015 that threatens members of the media with fines ranging from about US$25,000 to $60,000 for the distribution of wrong information on acts of terror inside the country "that differ from official declarations of the Egyptian Department of Defence".

=== Administrative divisions ===
Egypt is divided into 27 governorates. The governorates are further divided into regions. The regions contain towns and villages. Each governorate has a capital, sometimes carrying the same name as the governorate.

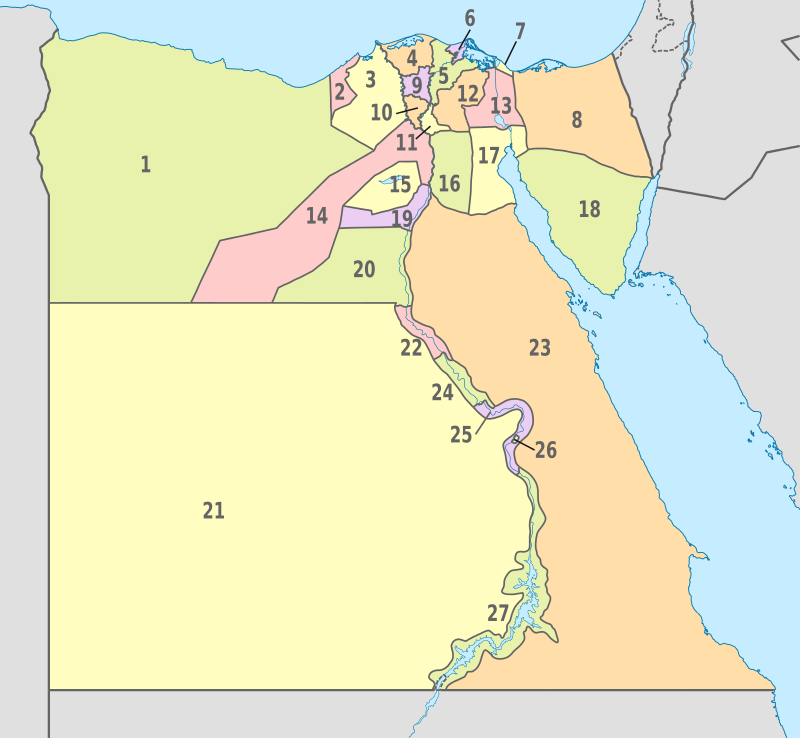
Governorates of Egypt: 1. Matrouh; 2. Alexandria; 3. Beheira; 4. Kafr El Sheikh; 5. Dakahlia; 6. Damietta; 7. Port Said; 8. North Sinai; 9. Gharbia; 10. Monufia; 11. Qalyubia; 12. Sharqia; 13. Ismailia; 14. Giza; 15. Faiyum; 16. Cairo; 17. Suez; 18. South Sinai; 19. Beni Suef; 20. Minya; 21. New Valley; 22. Asyut; 23. Red Sea; 24. Sohag; 25. Qena; 26. Luxor; 27. Aswan

== Economy ==
Change in per capita GDP of Egypt, 1820–2018. Figures are inflation-adjusted to 2011 International dollars.

The economy of Egypt is the second-largest in Africa and ranks 44th worldwide as of 2025. It is a major emerging market economy, marked by its membership in organisations like the African Union, Arab League, BRICS, and its participation in the African Continental Free Trade Area (AfCFTA). The Egyptian economy has evolved significantly since the early 2000s, transitioning towards a market-oriented system through fiscal and monetary reforms, privatisation efforts, and foreign investment incentives. These measures have contributed to macroeconomic stability and improved unemployment and poverty rates.

Despite waves of privatisation and fiscal reforms, the government remains one of the country's largest employers, and state contracts continue to stimulate activity in other sectors of the still partly socialised economy. Construction, particularly large-scale public works, has remained a major source of employment and public expenditure. However, as part of an $8 billion International Monetary Fund programme launched in 2024, Egypt has committed to rationalising such spending. As a result, private investments rose to 47.5% of total executed investments in FY 2024/25, up from 39.6%, while public investment fell to 43.3%. This marks the highest private share in five years and represents a clear shift in Egypt's investment landscape.

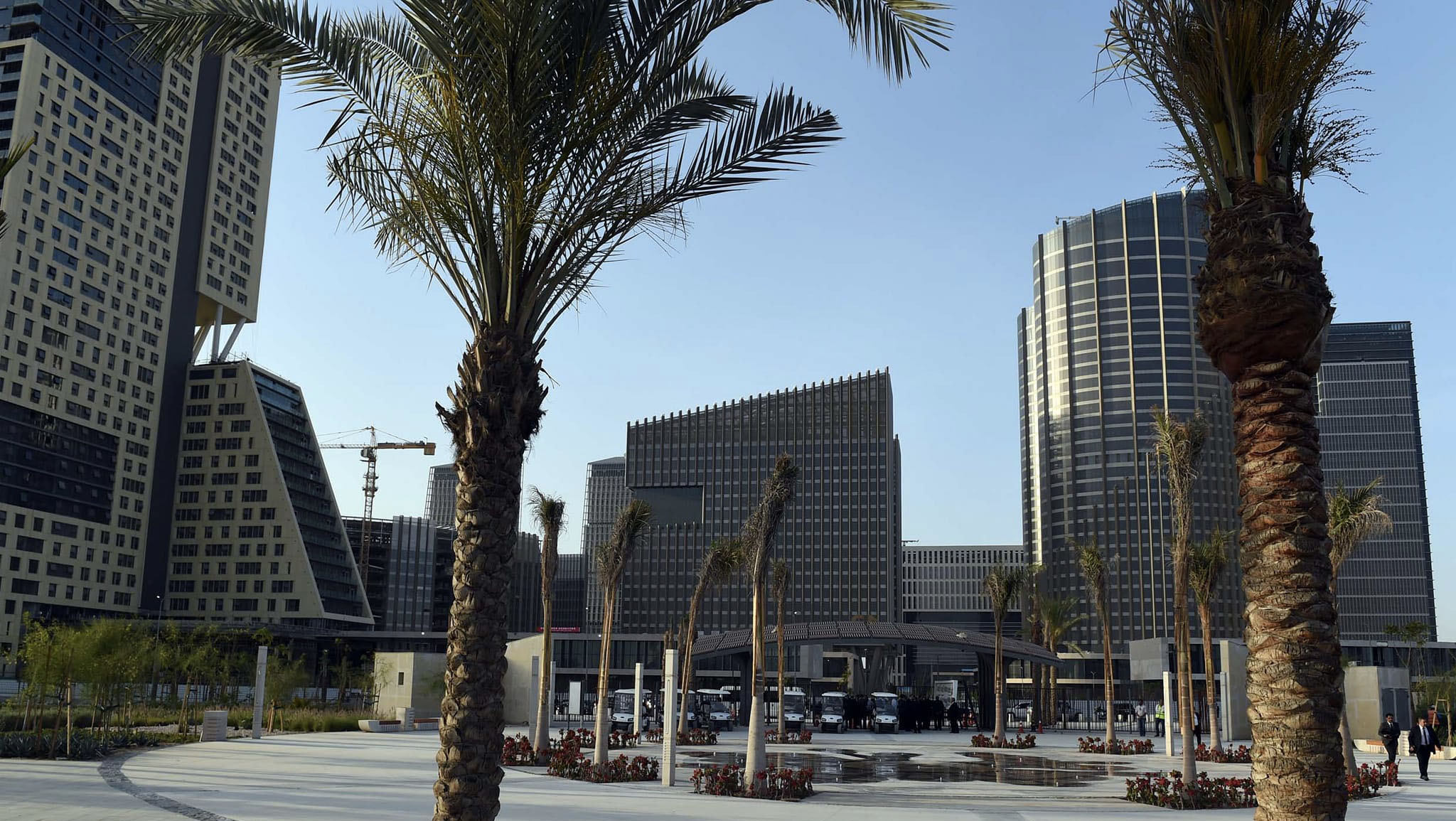
The central business district in Egypt's new capital

Egypt is among the world's top five recipients of remittances, which have more than doubled over the past decade, rising from $17.1 billion in FY 2015/2016 to a record $36.5 billion in FY 2024/2025, according to data from the Central Bank of Egypt. These inflows are crucial for Egypt's foreign reserves and household incomes.

International trade is a key component of Egypt's economy, accounting for 40% of GDP according to the World Bank. The country has pursued broader economic integration through free trade agreements, including the EU-Egypt Association Agreement and AfCFTA. Egypt's exports have seen significant growth in the past years, and the government aims to raise them to $145 billion by 2030.

Since 1979, Egypt has received substantial United States foreign aid, averaging $1.5 billion annually, with approximately $200 million allocated to economic assistance and the remainder directed towards military aid for procuring weapon systems from American suppliers.

=== Manufacturing ===
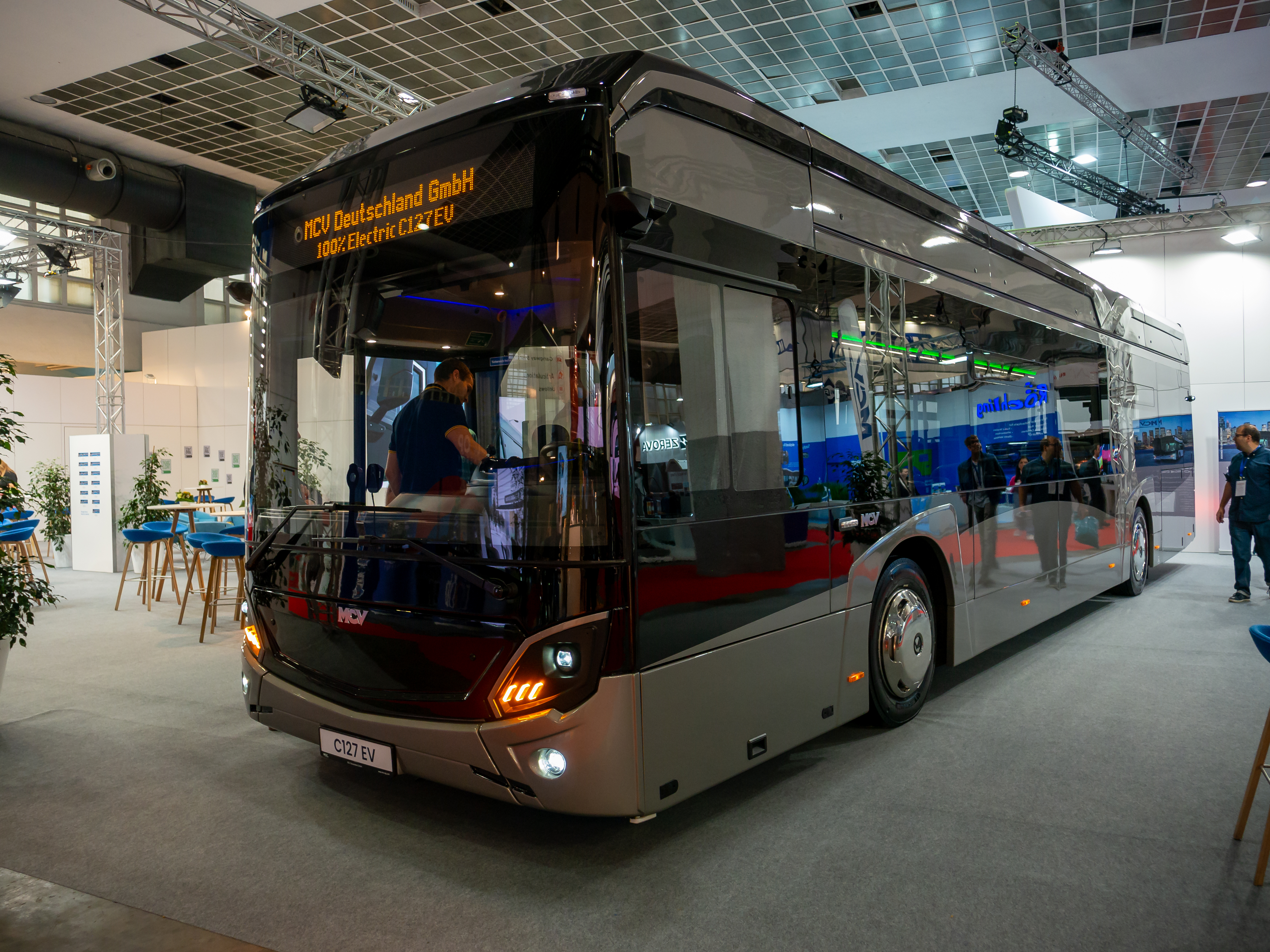
The fully electric MCV C127 EV, made in Egypt for the German market

Egypt has the largest manufacturing sector in Africa, accounting for approximately 22% of the continent's total manufacturing value. Under Egypt Vision 2030 and its related development plans, the country has relied on industrial parks, free zones and special economic zones to boost industrialisation and manufacturing.

The industrial base is diverse, spanning chemicals, electronics, steel, automotive manufacturing, pharmaceuticals, and textiles. The chemical industry, one of the largest, includes plastics, rubber, detergents, fertilisers, and glass, with petrochemicals alone contributing about 12% of industrial output, while total sector exports are projected to reach $9 billion in 2024.

Light manufacturing is one of Egypt's main industries, and several government-led programmes aim to grow it further. The Egypt Makes Electronics initiative has attracted factories from international firms, including Vivo, Infinix, Oppo, Xiaomi, Nokia, Electrolux, Samsung, Hisense, Beko, and Haier. These plants have made Egypt a regional centre for electronics and home appliance production. The textile industry is also a cornerstone of Egypt's economy, contributing around 12% of export earnings and employing 2.5 million people. It spans the entire production chain from cotton cultivation to finished garments and is globally recognised for its premium Giza cotton.

In addition to light manufacturing, the economy also includes a heavy manufacturing sector. Egypt is Africa's leading steel producer and ranks 20th globally, with 9.8 million tons in 2022. Egyptian steel company EZDK is the largest in the region, ranked 77th globally in 2020. The country's automotive industry, led by Nasr, Ghabbour, and MCV, is expanding through partnerships with global manufacturers under the government's 2024–2030 National Automotive Industry Development Strategy, which targets 500,000 vehicles annually and promotes local electric vehicle production.

=== Retail and services ===
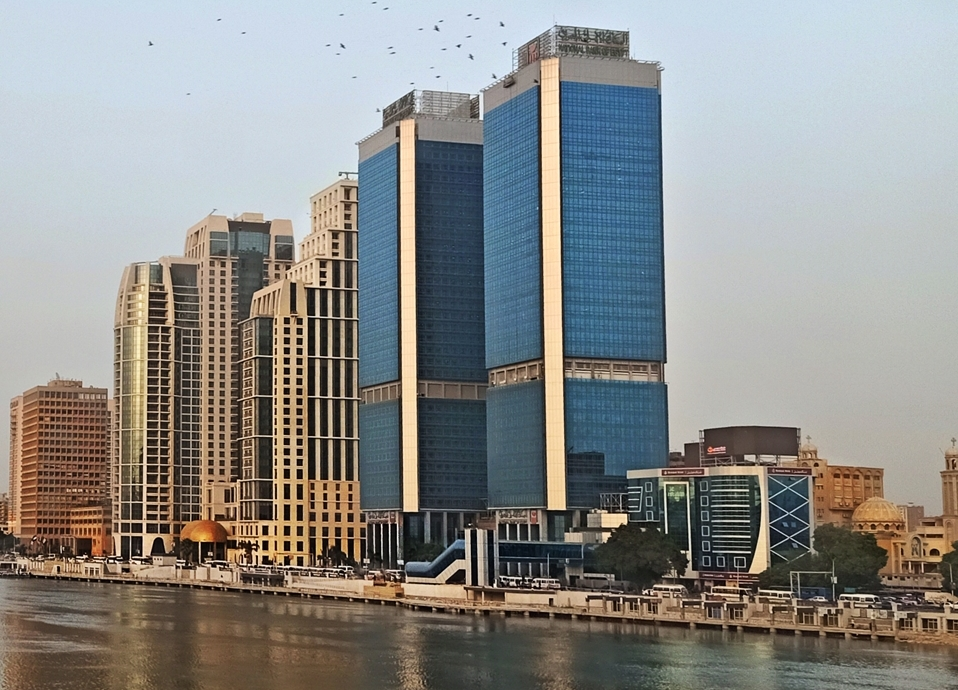
The National Bank of Egypt towers in Cairo

Egypt's retail and services sector has expanded steadily in recent years, driven by population growth, rising incomes, and urbanisation. As of 2020 the country's retail market, which covers shopping malls, supermarkets, convenience stores, and e-commerce platforms, was worth around $200 billion.

The retail food and grocery sector is still largely dominated by traditional, family-run stores and wet markets, although supermarket and convenience store chains expanded in both size and popularity between 2015 and 2020. Hypermarkets and wholesale discounters recorded the highest growth rates over this period, at 153% and 162% respectively, accounting for 26% of the sector's sales.

Many shopping malls have opened in Egypt in recent years. Cairo has the highest concentration with over 20 commercial malls, while smaller cities such as Mansoura and Tanta have only just got their first.

The Egyptian government controls much of the telecommunications sector through its majority ownership of Telecom Egypt. Between 2019 and 2022, mobile internet subscriptions in Egypt grew 77.9%, from 39 million to 69.4 million, with total mobile subscriptions reaching 106.2 million by December 2023. Internet penetration reached 72.2% in early 2024, with 82 million users. Since 2022 Egypt has the fastest internet speeds in Africa.

Egyptian banks are among the largest and most dynamic in the region. Most Egyptian lenders are adopting new technologies to expand into nonbanking financial services. The fintech sector has grown 5.5-fold since 2020, with 177 startups, ranking Egypt 10th among emerging markets. The banking sector is dominated by four state-owned commercial banks, the National Bank of Egypt, Banque Misr, Banque du Caire, and Alexbank, which together account for about 55% of total banking assets. CIB is the country's largest private bank and the third-largest overall.

=== Hydrocarbons and mining ===
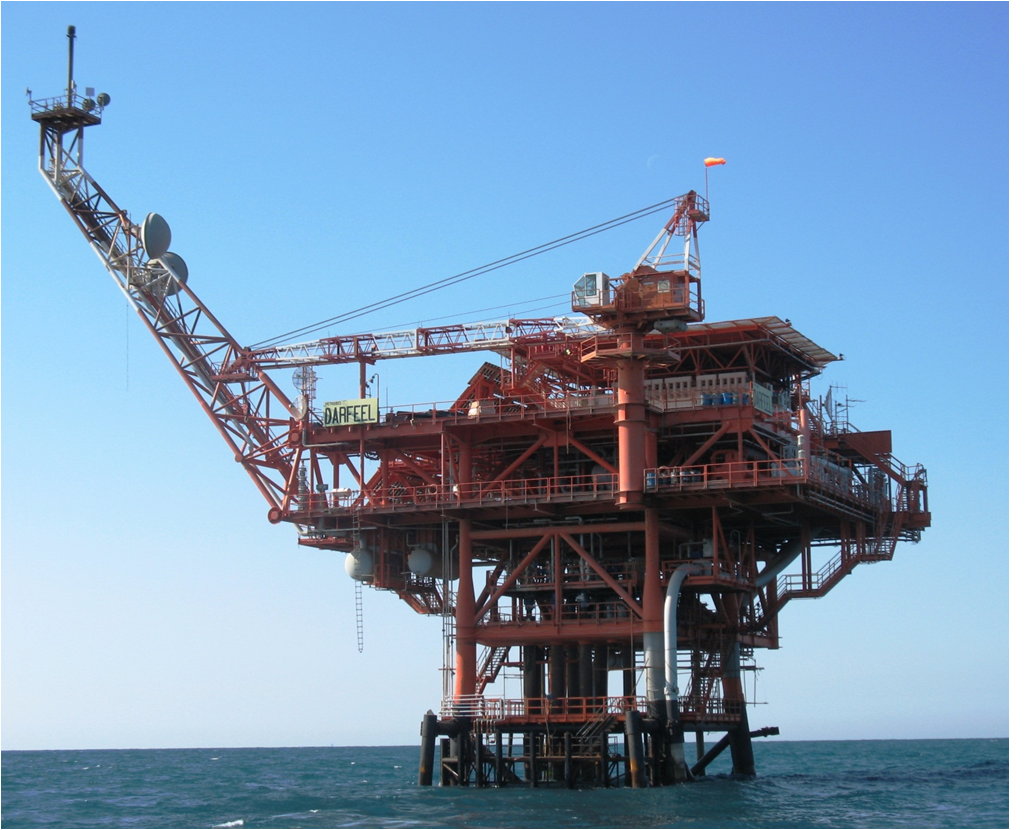
An offshore platform in the Darfeel Gas Field

Egypt's oil production is concentrated in the Western Desert, the Gulf of Suez, and the Nile Delta, with peak crude oil output reaching approximately 941,000 bbl/d (149,600 m^{3}/d) in 1993 before declining to 630,000 bbl/d (100,000 m^{3}/d) by 2008. This decline transformed Egypt into a net oil importer by 2008–2009, prompting a strategic shift towards natural gas.

Natural gas has since become central to Egypt's economy, drawing major foreign investment. The Zohr gas field, discovered by Eni in 2015, is the Mediterranean's largest reserve, containing about 30 trillion cubic feet of gas. Production began in 2017 and reached 2.7 billion cubic feet per day (bcf/d) by 2019, greatly enhancing Egypt's energy outlook, though recent technical issues have reduced output; new drilling is planned to restore capacity. BP has made major investments, including a $12 billion commitment in 2015 to the West Nile Delta project, along with other developments such as Atoll, North Damietta, and Qattameya, which began production in 2020.

Egypt possesses substantial mineral wealth, with deposits of gold, copper, iron ore, phosphate, uranium, tantalum, manganese, chromium, coal, zinc, lead, tin, and black sand minerals such as ilmenite, zircon, rutile, and magnetite. It also produces abundant industrial materials like granite, marble, limestone, white sand, kaolin, and feldspar. The gold mining sector has grown rapidly following investment reforms and exploration bids involving AngloGold Ashanti and Alexander Nubia International. The Sukari mine remains the core operation, with the sector's GDP share expected to reach 5–6% by 2030. Gold exports doubled to $2.17 billion in 2024, with Egypt aiming to join the world's top ten exporters by 2027.

=== Agriculture ===
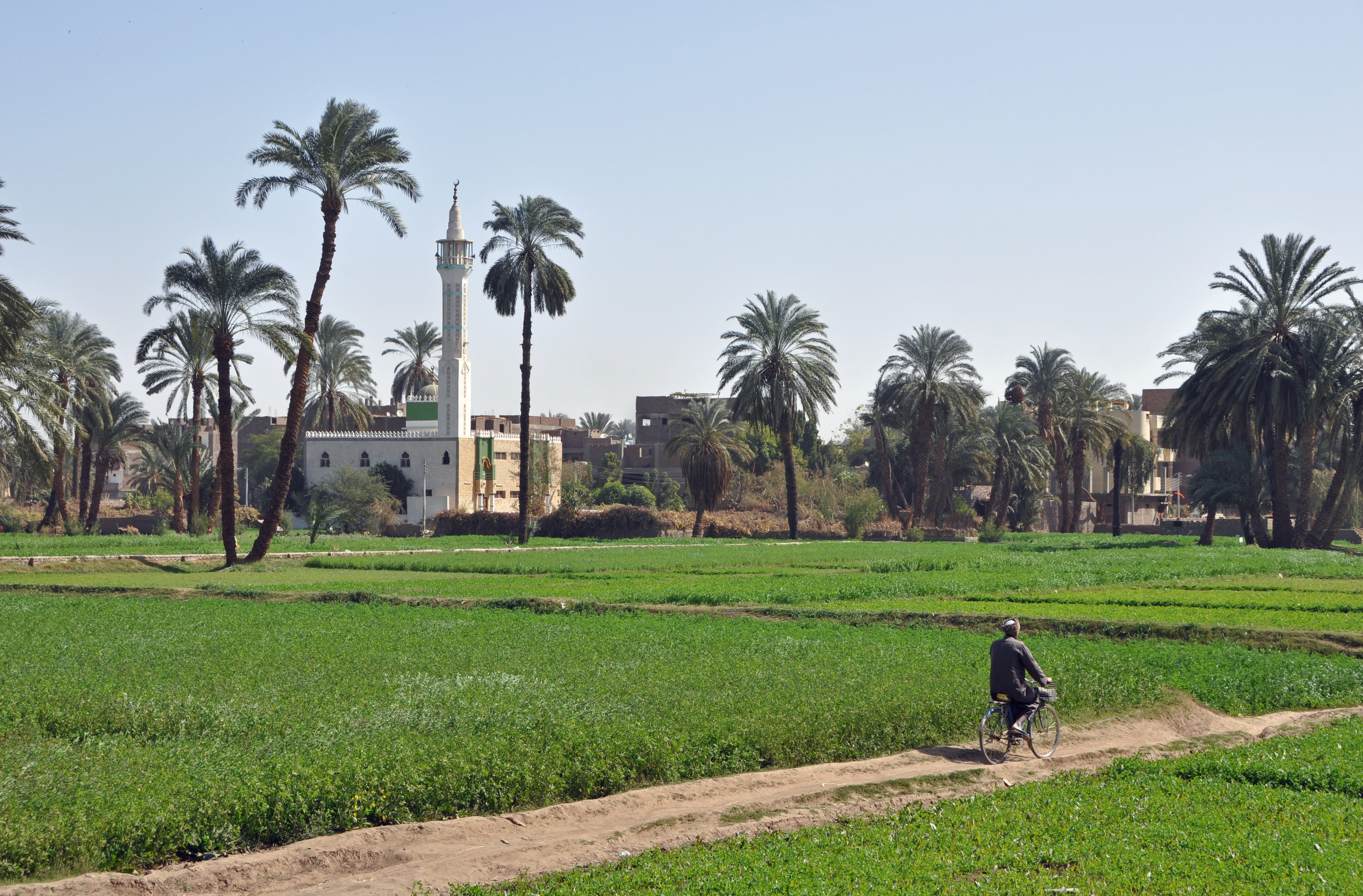
Farmland in the Egyptian countryside

Egypt's agricultural sector remains essential to its economy, though its share of GDP and employment has declined over time. Egypt produces substantial quantities of wheat, maize, sugarcane, fruits, vegetables, fodder, and rice, yet remains reliant on wheat and maize imports, primarily from Ukraine and Russia, despite yield improvements since 1970. This dependency stems from high domestic demand, driven by subsidies and a culinary preference for bread, as well as Egypt's limited arable land and its emphasis on high-value export crops. In 2024, Egypt exported $4.1 billion in agricultural goods and roughly $6.1 billion in food industry products.

The country has achieved self-sufficiency in several key agricultural products, including vegetables, fruits, poultry, dairy, eggs, and rice, while nearing full self-sufficiency in sugar and fish, with production reaching approximately 90% of demand. Self-sufficiency ratios are lower for red meat (60%), cereals (58%), vegetable oils (26%), and oil crops (35%). Consequently, Egypt relies on imports for roughly 45% of its domestic food demand.

The Aswan High Dam, completed in 1971, improved irrigation stability. In 2010, 3.6 million hectares were cultivated, with the government targeting 4.8 million hectares by 2030. Major initiatives include the New Delta and Toshka Project, designed to convert desert areas into farmland using advanced irrigation techniques, wastewater treatment, groundwater and water desalination. Efforts to deregulate agriculture have improved price alignment with global markets, but climate change and water scarcity continue to pose long-term challenges.

=== Tourism ===
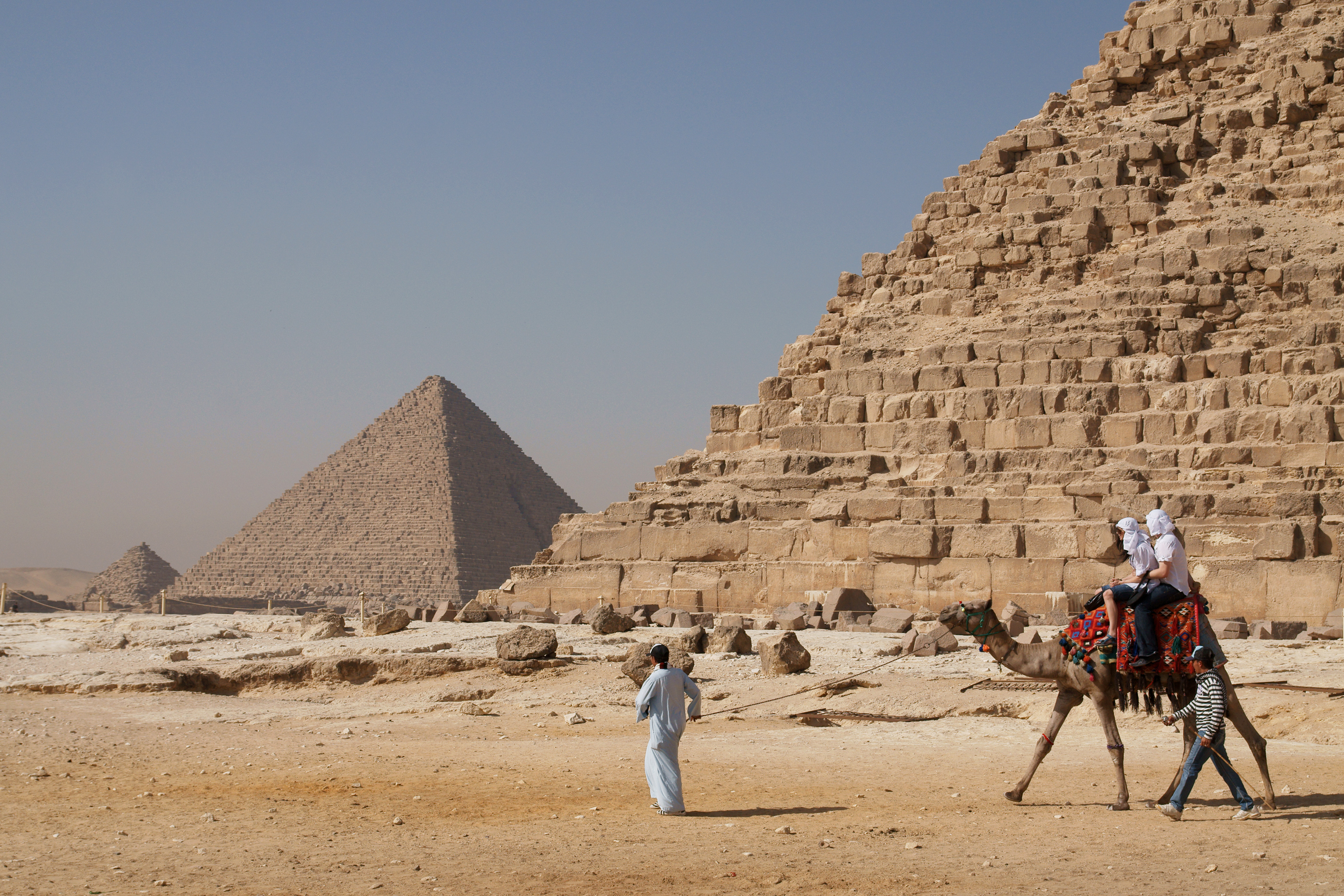
Tourists riding a camel in front of Pyramid of Khafre. The Giza Necropolis is one of Egypt's main tourist attractions.

Tourism is an important sector in Egypt's economy. Egypt received a record 15.7 million tourists in 2024, up from 14.9 million in 2023. Tourism revenues also rose, to $14.1 billion.

Egypt's tourism strategy aims to attract 30 million tourists by 2028, with a focus on infrastructure improvements, high-profile projects like the Grand Egyptian Museum, and enhancing visitor experiences. In 2024, the country's top tourism markets included Germany, Russia, and Saudi Arabia. The Giza Necropolis is one of Egypt's best-known tourist attractions; it is the only one of the Seven Wonders of the Ancient World still in existence.

Egypt's beaches on the Mediterranean and the Red Sea, which extend to over 3,000 kilometres (1,900 miles), are also popular tourist destinations; the Gulf of Aqaba beaches, Safaga, Sharm el-Sheikh, Hurghada, Luxor, Dahab, Ras Sidr and Marsa Alam are popular sites.

== Infrastructure ==
=== Energy ===
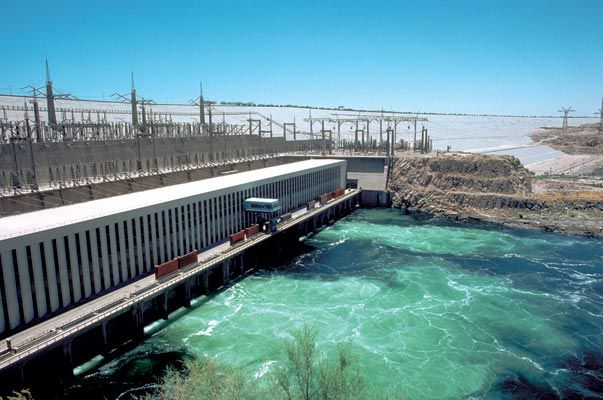
Power plant of the Aswan High Dam, with the dam itself in the background

Egypt's electricity sector has shifted from full state control to a more diversified energy mix that includes natural gas, renewables, and nuclear power, with growing private sector participation and regional interconnections. Fossil fuels still dominate, generating 88% of electricity in 2023, while hydropower provides 7% and wind and solar together 5%, up from 1% in 2015 but still below the global average of 13% and Africa's 6%. Egypt remains Africa's largest producer of gas-fired electricity, accounting for 45% of the continent's total in 2022, yet its per capita carbon emissions remain below the global average.

The government undertook a series of rapid reforms in response to blackouts during the summer of 2014 that lasted for up to six hours per day, cutting energy subsidies, and quickly developing the Zohr gas field in the Mediterranean, which was discovered in 2015. The country now has an oversupply of electricity and aims to source 20% of its electricity from renewables by 2022 and 55% by 2050. As part of its renewable energy strategy, Egypt has undertaken large-scale projects like the Benban Solar Park and the Gabal El Zeit wind farm. Benban, located near Aswan, has a total capacity of 1650 MW and generates about 3.8 TWh annually, making it the fourth-largest solar power plant globally. Additionally, the Gabal El Zeit wind farm, costing €340 million, spans 100 square kilometres with 300 turbines, generating 580 MW of electricity. Egypt is currently constructing its first nuclear power facility, the El Dabaa Nuclear Power Plant, in the northern coastal region.

Egypt and Cyprus are considering implementing the proposed EuroAfrica Interconnector project. This consists of laying a 2 GW HVDC undersea power cable between them and between Cyprus and Greece, thus connecting Egypt to the greater European power grid. The interconnector will make Egypt an electricity hub between Europe and Africa. The president of Egypt and the prime minister of Cyprus met in Nicosia on 21 November 2017 and showed their full support for the EuroAfrica Interconnector pointing out its importance for their energy security.

=== Transport ===
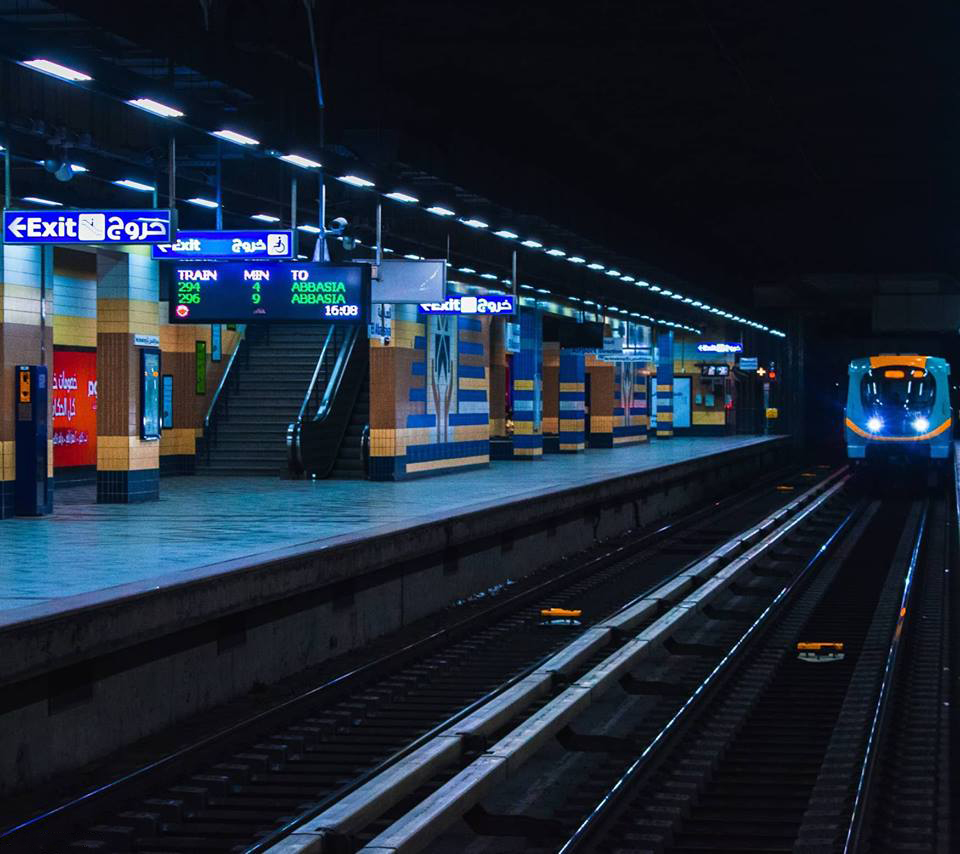
The Cairo Metro

Transport in Egypt is primarily concentrated around Cairo, following the Nile River's settlement patterns. The country's 4,800-kilometre (3,000 mi) railway network is operated by Egyptian National Railways, with its main line running from Alexandria to Aswan. In 2021, Egypt launched a $4.5 billion high-speed rail project to connect Ain Sokhna, Mersa Matruh, and Alexandria, later expanding to include routes linking Greater Cairo to Aswan and Luxor to Hurghada and Safaga.

The Cairo Metro operates three lines, with a fourth line under construction and plans for additional expansions in the future. Meanwhile, two monorail lines are also being built in the city, along with a metro system in Alexandria.

Egypt has undertaken major road infrastructure expansion through the National Roads Project, increasing the total length of main roads by nearly 30% from 23,500 km in 2014 to 30,500 km in 2024. Alongside constructing new highways, thousands of kilometres of roads have been upgraded. Egypt's ranking in the Road Quality Index rose from 118th place in 2015 to 18th place in 2024.

Egypt's aviation sector is led by EgyptAir, the country's flag carrier and largest airline, founded in 1932 by Talaat Harb. Now state-owned, EgyptAir operates from its Cairo International Airport hub, with scheduled passenger and cargo services to over 75 destinations across the Middle East, Europe, Africa, Asia, and the Americas. The airline's current fleet consists of 80 aircraft.

The Suez Canal, an artificial sea-level waterway, connects the Mediterranean Sea and the Red Sea, enabling direct shipping between Europe and Asia without navigating around Africa. In 2023, it generated a record $9.4 billion in revenue for Egypt. Opened in November 1869, the 193.30 km (120 1/8 mi) canal runs from Port Said in the north to Port Tawfiq in the south, with Ismailia situated 3 kilometres (1 7/8 miles) west of its midpoint.

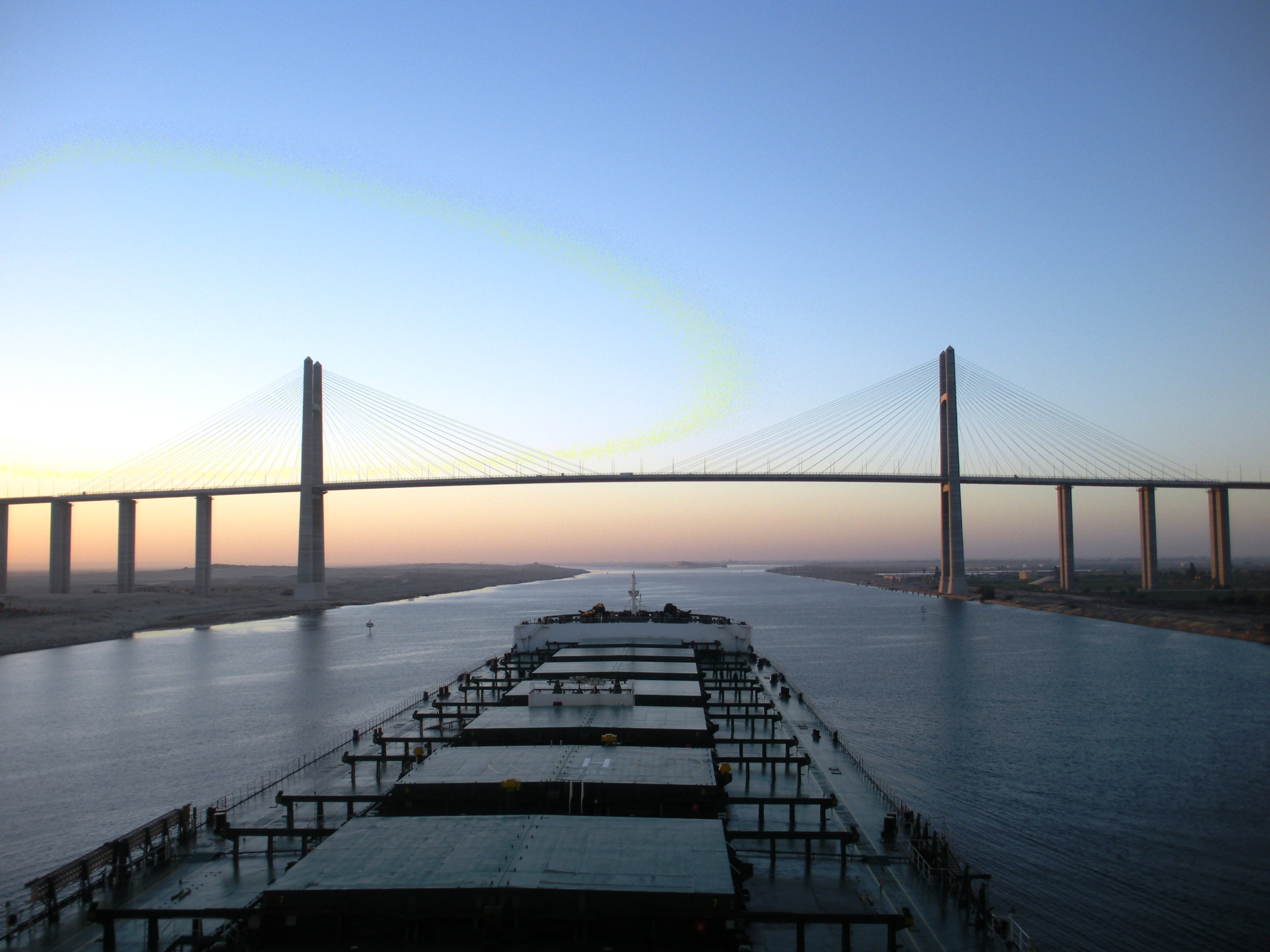
The Suez Canal Bridge

The canal is 24 metres (79 feet) deep and 205 m (673 ft) wide as of 2010, consisting of a 22 km (14 mi) northern access channel, a 162.25 km (100 7/8 mi) main section, and a 9 km (5 1/2 mi) southern access channel. The Ballah By-Pass and the Great Bitter Lake provide passing points along the canal, which operates without locks, allowing seawater to flow freely. Expansions completed in 2015 increased its daily capacity from 49 to 97 ships, reducing transit times and boosting global maritime trade.

=== Water supply and sanitation ===
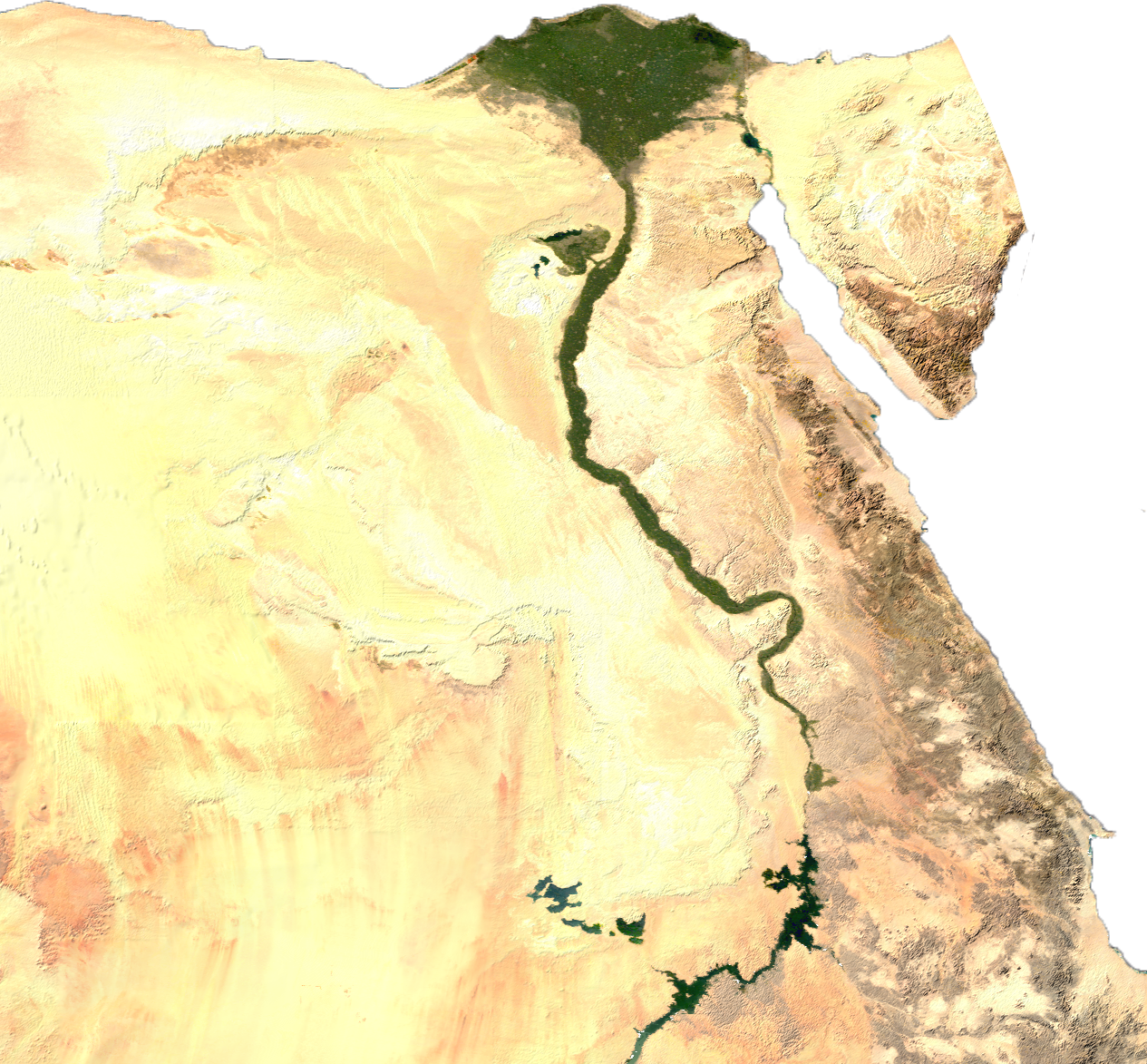
Green irrigated land along the Nile amidst the desert and in the Nile Delta

Egypt's water supply is heavily dependent on the Nile River, which provides approximately 90% of the country's total water resources, with an annual share of 55 billion cubic metres, unchanged since 1954. An additional 0.5 billion cubic metres comes from non-renewable groundwater sources. However, national demand exceeds 90 billion cubic metres annually, creating a persistent water deficit. As a result, Egypt's per capita water share fell to 570 cubic metres in 2018, well below the 1,000 cubic metre international water scarcity threshold. To address this, the government has prioritised efficient water management, particularly in response to population growth and agricultural expansion.

Even so, water access has improved sharply. Between 1990 and 2010, piped water coverage rose from 89% to 100% in urban areas and from 39% to 93% in rural areas, eliminating open defecation in rural regions and achieving near-universal access to an improved water source. By 2015, 90% of the population had access to safely managed drinking water, increasing to 96.9% by 2019. Similarly, proper sanitation coverage expanded from 50% in 2015 to 66.2% in 2019, while the percentage of treated wastewater relative to total wastewater rose from 50% to 68.7% in the same period, reaching 74% in 2022. However, gaps in sanitation infrastructure have historically led to health concerns, with a 2007 report estimating 17,000 child deaths annually from diarrhoeal diseases linked to poor sanitation.

Egypt has made significant investments in wastewater treatment infrastructure as part of its broader water management strategy. In 2021, the Bahr El Baqar Wastewater Treatment Plant was completed, becoming the largest in the world at the time, with a capacity of 5 million cubic metres per day. The treated water from this facility is allocated to irrigating 342,000 acres under the Sinai Peninsula Development Plan. In 2023, Egypt inaugurated the New Delta Wastewater Treatment Plant, surpassing Bahr El Baqar as the largest wastewater facility globally, with a capacity of 7.5 million cubic metres per day. A key component of Egypt's agricultural expansion strategy, the plant supports the New Delta reclamation project while also reducing pollution in Lake Mariout and the Mediterranean Sea.

Given Egypt's arid climate and lack of appreciable rainfall, agriculture is entirely dependent on irrigation. The Nile River, regulated by the Aswan High Dam, releases an annual average of 55 billion cubic metres, of which 46 billion cubic metres are diverted into irrigation canals. This irrigation sustains 33,600 square kilometres (13,000 square miles) of agricultural land in the Nile Valley and Nile Delta, producing an average of 1.8 crops per year.

== Demographics ==
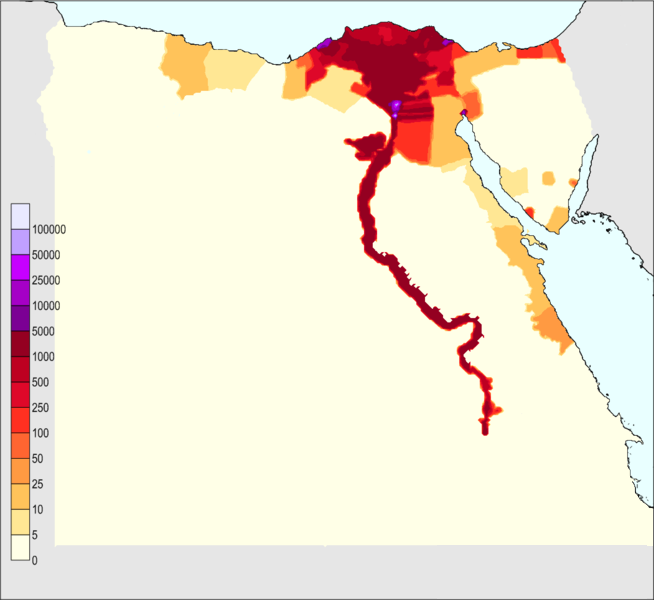
Egypt's population density in 2010 (people per km^{2})

Egypt is the most populated country in the Arab world and the third most populous on the African continent, with about 120 million inhabitants as of 2026. Its population grew rapidly from 1970 to 2010 due to medical advances and increases in agricultural productivity enabled by the Green Revolution. Egypt's population was estimated at 3 million when Napoleon invaded the country in 1798. The great majority of its people live near the banks of the Nile River, an area of about 40,000 square kilometres (15,000 sq mi), where the only arable land is found. The large regions of the Sahara desert, which constitute most of Egypt's territory, are sparsely inhabited. About 43% of Egypt's residents live across the country's urban areas, with most spread across the densely populated centres of greater Cairo, Alexandria and other major cities in the Nile Delta.

Egypt's people are highly urbanised, being concentrated along the Nile (notably Cairo and Alexandria), in the Delta and near the Suez Canal. Egyptians are divided demographically into those who live in the major urban centres and the fellahin, or farmers, that reside in rural villages. The total inhabited area constitutes only 77,041 km^{2}, putting the physiological density at over 1,200 people per km^{2}, similar to Bangladesh.

While emigration was restricted under Nasser, thousands of Egyptian professionals were dispatched abroad in the context of the Arab Cold War. Egyptian emigration was liberalised in 1971, under President Sadat, reaching record numbers after the 1973 oil crisis. An estimated 2.7 million Egyptians live abroad. Approximately 70% of Egyptian migrants live in Arab countries (923,600 in Saudi Arabia, 332,600 in Libya, 226,850 in Jordan, 190,550 in Kuwait with the rest elsewhere in the region) and the remaining 30% reside mostly in Europe and North America (318,000 in the United States, 110,000 in Canada and 90,000 in Italy). The process of emigrating to non-Arab states has been ongoing since the 1950s.

=== Ethnic groups ===
Ethnic Egyptians are by far the largest ethnic group in the country, constituting 99.7% of the total population. Ethnic minorities include the Circassians, Turks, Greeks, Bedouin Arab tribes living in the eastern deserts and the Sinai Peninsula, the Berber-speaking Siwis (Amazigh) of the Siwa Oasis, and the Nubian communities clustered along the Nile. There are also tribal Beja communities concentrated in the southeasternmost corner of the country, and a number of Dom clans mostly in the Nile Delta and Faiyum who are progressively becoming assimilated as urbanisation increases.

Egypt hosts a migrant population of over 9 million, constituting 8.7% of the country's total population, according to the International Organization for Migration. These migrants originate from 133 countries, with the largest groups being Sudanese (4 million), Syrians (1.5 million), Yemenis (1 million), and Libyans (1 million), collectively making up 80% of all international migrants in Egypt.

=== Languages ===
The official language of Egypt is Literary Arabic. The spoken languages are: Egyptian Arabic (68%), Sa'idi Arabic (29%), Eastern Egyptian Bedawi Arabic (1.6%), Sudanese Arabic (0.6%), Domari (0.3%), Nobiin (0.3%), Beja (0.1%), Siwi and others. Additionally, Greek, Armenian and Italian, and more recently, African languages like Amharic and Tigrigna are the main languages of immigrants.

The main foreign languages taught in schools, by order of popularity, are English, French, German and Italian.

Historically Egyptian was spoken, the latest stage of which is Coptic Egyptian. Spoken Coptic was mostly extinct by the 17th century but may have survived in isolated pockets in Upper Egypt as late as the 19th century. It remains in use as the liturgical language of the Coptic Orthodox Church of Alexandria. It forms a separate branch among the family of Afroasiatic languages.

=== Religion ===
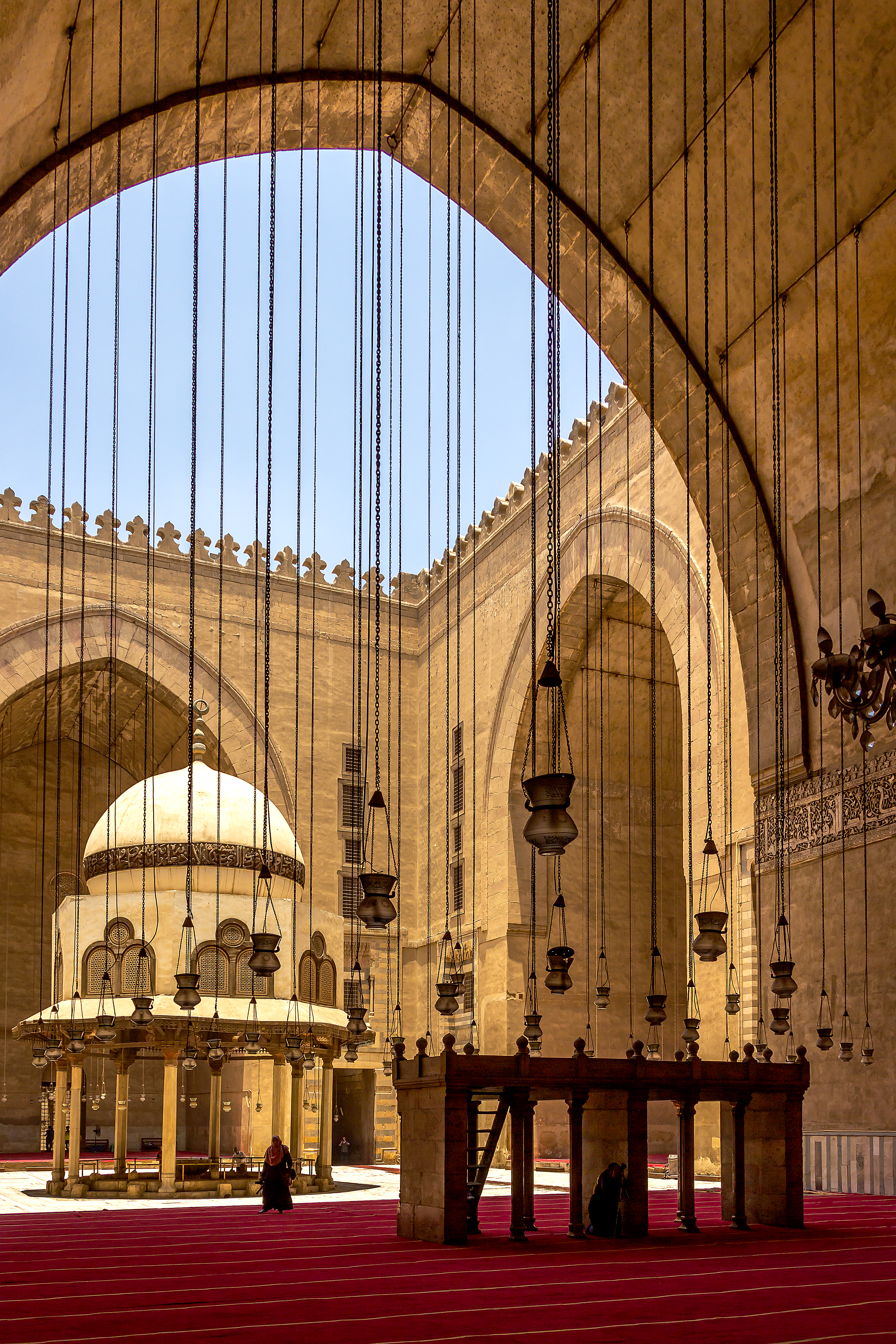
Madrasa-Mosque of Sultan Hassan

Islam is the state religion of Egypt. Egypt has the largest Muslim population in the Arab world and the world's sixth largest Muslim population, accounting for five percent of all Muslims worldwide. Egypt also has the largest Christian population in the Middle East and North Africa. Official data about religion is lacking due to social and political sensitivities. An estimated 85–90% are identified as Muslim, 10–15% as Coptic Christians, and 1% as other Christian denominations; other estimates place the Christian population as high as 15–20%. (Note: The population of Egypt is estimated as being 90% Muslim, 9% Coptic Christian and 1% other Christian, though estimates vary. Microsoft Encarta Online similarly estimates the Sunni population at 90% of the total. The Pew Forum on Religion and Public Life gave a higher estimate of the Muslim population, at 94.6%. In 2017, the government-owned newspaper Al Ahram estimated the percentage of Christians at 10 to 15%.)

Egypt was an early and leading centre of Christianity into late antiquity. The Coptic Orthodox Church of Alexandria was founded in the first century and remains the largest church in Egypt. With the arrival of Islam in the seventh century, Egypt was gradually Islamised into a majority-Muslim country. It is unknown when Muslims reached a majority, variously estimated from c. 1000 CE to as late as the 14th century. Egypt emerged as a centre of politics and culture in the Muslim world. Under Anwar Sadat, Islam became the official state religion and Sharia the main source of law.

The majority of Egyptian Muslims adhere to the Sunni branch of Islam. Nondenominational Muslims form roughly 12% of the population. There is also a Shi'a minority. The Jerusalem Centre for Public Affairs estimates the Shia population at 1 to 2.2 million and could measure as much as 3 million. The Ahmadiyya population is estimated at less than 50,000, whereas the Salafi (ultra-conservative Sunni) population is estimated at five to six million.

Cairo is famous for its numerous mosque minarets and has been dubbed "The City of 1,000 Minarets". The city also hosts Al-Azhar University, which is considered the preeminent institution of Islamic higher learning and jurisprudence. Founded in the late tenth century, it is by some measures the second oldest continuously operating university in the world.

It is estimated that 15 million Egyptians follow native Sufi orders, with Sufi leadership asserting that the numbers are much greater, as many Egyptian Sufis are not officially registered with a Sufi order. At least 305 people were killed during a November 2017 attack on a Sufi mosque in Sinai.

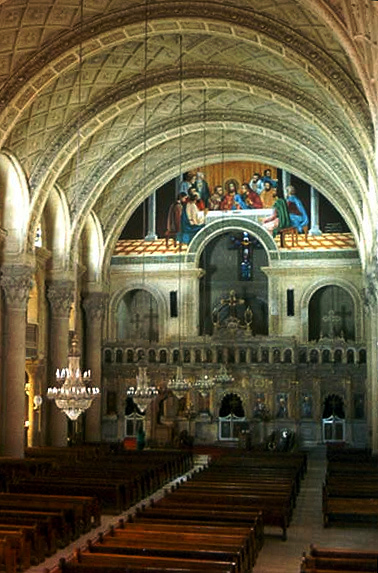
St. Mark Coptic Cathedral in Alexandria

Of the Christian population in Egypt, over 90% belong to the native Coptic Orthodox Church of Alexandria, an Oriental Orthodox Christian Church. Other native Egyptian Christians are adherents of the Coptic Catholic Church, the Evangelical Church of Egypt and various other Protestant denominations. Non-native Christian communities are largely found in the urban regions of Cairo and Alexandria, such as the Syro-Lebanese, who belong to Greek Catholic, Greek Orthodox, and Maronite Catholic denominations.

The Egyptian government recognises only three religions: Islam, Christianity, and Judaism. Other faiths and minority Muslim sects, such as the small Baháʼí Faith and Ahmadiyya communities, are not recognised by the state and face persecution by the government, which labels these groups a threat to Egypt's national security. Individuals, particularly Baháʼís and atheists, wishing to include their religion (or lack thereof) on their mandatory state issued identification cards are denied this ability, and were put in the position of either not obtaining required identification or lying about their faith. A 2008 court ruling allowed members of unrecognised faiths to obtain identification and leave the religion field blank.

=== Education ===
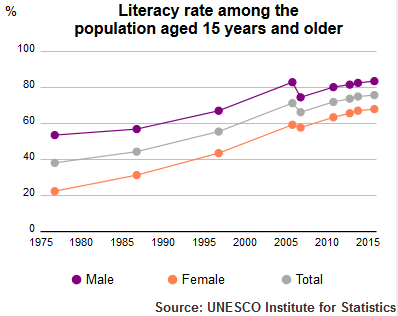
Egyptian literacy rate among the population aged 15 years and older by UNESCO Institute of Statistics

In 2022, Egypt's adult literacy rate was 74.5%, compared to 71.1% in 2017. Literacy is lowest among those over 65 years of age, at 32.9% in 2021, and highest among youth between 15 and 24 years of age, at 92.2% in 2022.

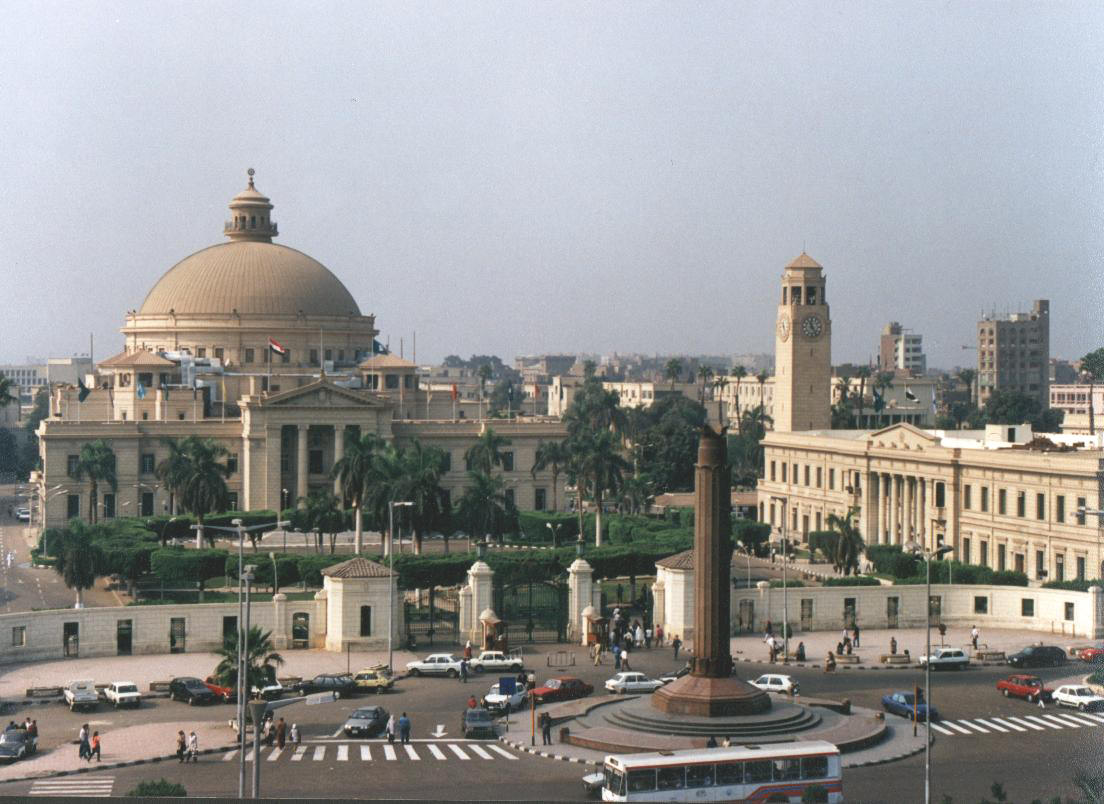
Cairo University

A European-style education system was first introduced in Egypt by the Ottomans in the early 19th century to nurture a class of loyal bureaucrats and army officers. Under British occupation, investment in education was curbed drastically, and secular public schools, which had previously been free, began to charge fees.

In the 1950s, President Nasser phased in free education for all Egyptians. The Egyptian curriculum influenced other Arab education systems, which often employed Egyptian-trained teachers. Demand soon outstripped the level of available state resources, causing the quality of public education to deteriorate. Today this trend has culminated in poor teacher–student ratios (often around one to fifty) and persistent gender inequality.

Basic education, which includes six years of primary and three years of preparatory school, is a right for Egyptian children from the age of six. After grade 9, students are tracked into one of two strands of secondary education: general or technical schools. General secondary education prepares students for further education, and graduates of this track normally join higher education institutes based on the results of the Thanaweya Amma, the leaving exam. In 2025 Egypt introduced a new Baccalaureate Certificate System which will replace the Thanaweya Amma starting 2026.

Technical secondary education has two strands, one lasting three years and a more advanced education lasting five. Graduates of these schools may have access to higher education based on their results on the final exam, but this is generally uncommon.

The QS World University Rankings 2025 includes 15 Egyptian universities, with Cairo University ranked highest among them. The American University in Cairo follows, improving its position to 410th place. Several Egyptian universities rose in the rankings compared with the previous year.

Egypt is opening new research institutes to modernise scientific research and development. The most recent is Zewail City of Science and Technology. Egypt was ranked 86th in the Global Innovation Index in 2025.

=== Health ===
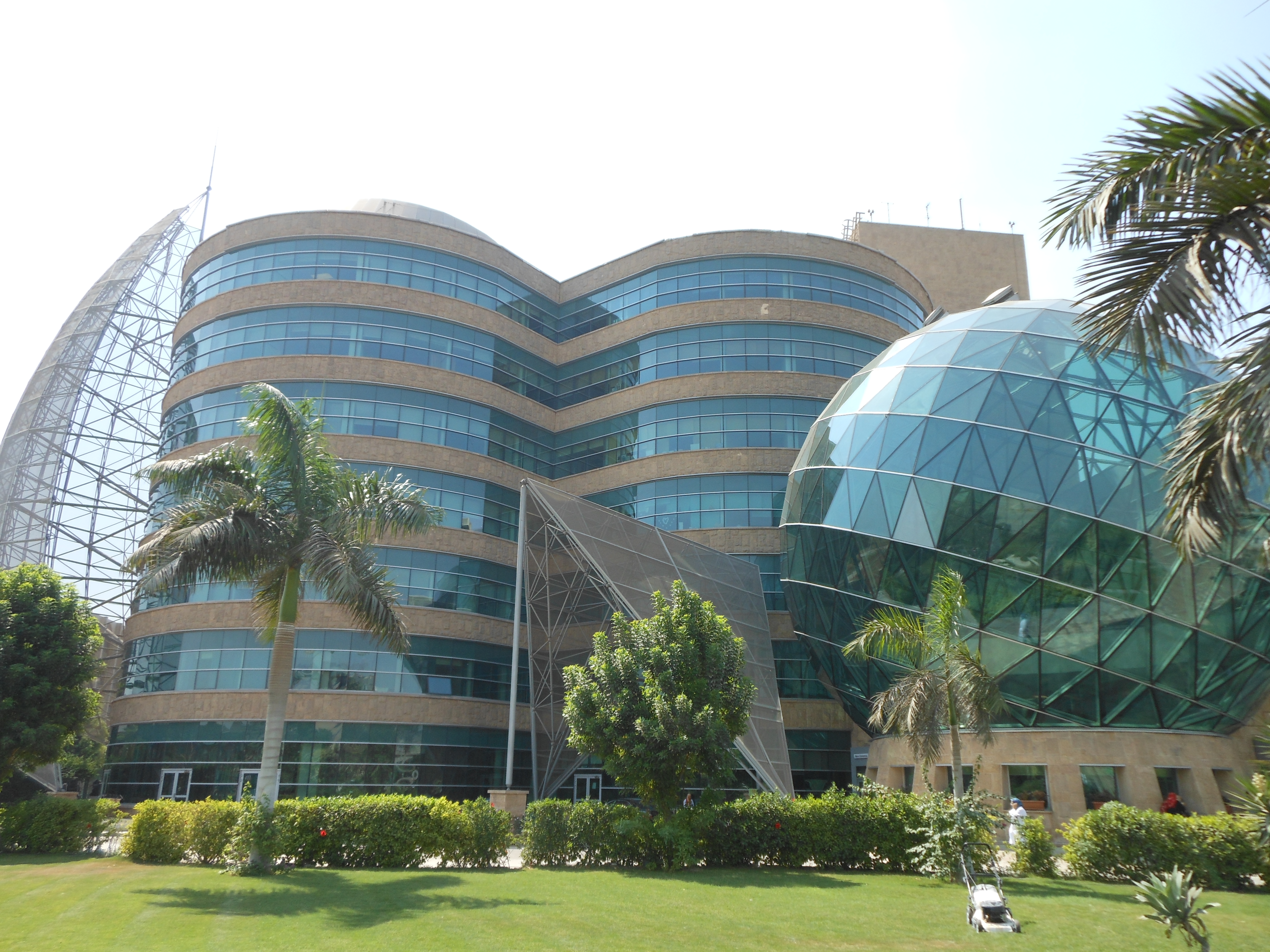
Egypt's children cancer hospital known as 57357 hospital

As of 2024, Egypt's average life expectancy is 75 years, with 73.8 years for males and 76.2 years for females. Healthcare access has improved in both urban and rural areas, with immunisation programmes now covering 98% of the population. Life expectancy has risen from 45 years in the 1960s, as medical services and disease prevention improved. The infant mortality rate has also declined sharply, dropping from 101 to 132 deaths per 1,000 live births in the 1970s and 1980s to 50–60 per 1,000 in 2000, and further to 16–18 per 1,000 in 2024.

The Ministry of Health and Population oversees most public hospitals, while the Ministry of Higher Education and Scientific Research manages university hospitals, offering free medical services. Other ministries operate hospitals for employees, and the Ministry of Defence and Ministry of Interior run facilities that require out-of-pocket payments for non-service members.

The private sector provides about 60% of healthcare services, including for-profit and nonprofit organisations, private hospitals, pharmacies, and independent practitioners. Numerous nongovernmental organisations also offer healthcare, including religious and charitable institutions. As of 2021, Egypt had 1,145 private hospitals, a 23.69% increase since 2011. Private healthcare facilities in Egypt are generally of high quality.

Egypt grants refugees and asylum-seekers access to public healthcare on equal terms with citizens, allowing them to receive care at primary health facilities either free or at low cost.

A 2008 report by the World Health Organisation estimated that 91.1% of Egypt's girls and women aged 15 to 49 have been subjected to genital mutilation. Government measures have reduced the practice among younger generations. By 2014, rates had dropped to 10.4% in urban areas and 15.9% in rural areas among girls aged 1–14. In June 2025 the Minister of Social Solidarity announced that the percentage of girls aged 15 to 17 who had undergone the practice dropped to 37 percent in 2021, compared to 61 percent in 2014. Public support for FGM has also fallen, with the proportion of women endorsing the practice decreasing from 75 percent in 2000 to 30 percent in 2021. Legislative reforms, awareness campaigns, and stricter law enforcement contributed to this decline. In 2016, penalties for performing the practice were increased, with prison sentences of up to 15 years for practitioners and up to 3 years for guardians who facilitate the procedure.

=== Largest cities ===
Largest cities or towns in Egypt 2023 estimate
Rank	Name	Governorate	Pop.	Rank	Name	Governorate	Pop.
1	Cairo	Cairo	9,801,536	11	Faiyum	Faiyum	531,861
2	Alexandria	Alexandria	5,362,517	12	Khusus	Qalyubia	502,864
3	Giza	Giza	4,458,135	13	Zagazig	Sharqia	460,501
4	Shubra El Kheima	Qalyubia	1,275,700	14	Ismailia	Ismailia	450,388
5	Port Said	Port Said	791,749	15	Aswan	Aswan	401,890
6	Suez	Suez	716,458	16	6th of October	Giza	376,302
7	Mansoura	Dakahlia	632,330	17	Damanhur	Beheira	329,572
8	El Mahalla El Kubra	Gharbia	614,202	18	New Cairo	Cairo	319,488
9	Tanta	Gharbia	597,694	19	Damietta	Damietta	312,863
10	Asyut	Asyut	562,061	20	Minya	Minya	298,021

== Culture ==
Egypt is a recognised cultural trendsetter of the Arabic-speaking world. Contemporary Arabic and Middle-Eastern culture is heavily influenced by Egyptian literature, music, film and television. Egypt gained a regional leadership role during the 1950s and 1960s, giving a further enduring boost to the standing of Egyptian culture in the Arabic-speaking world.

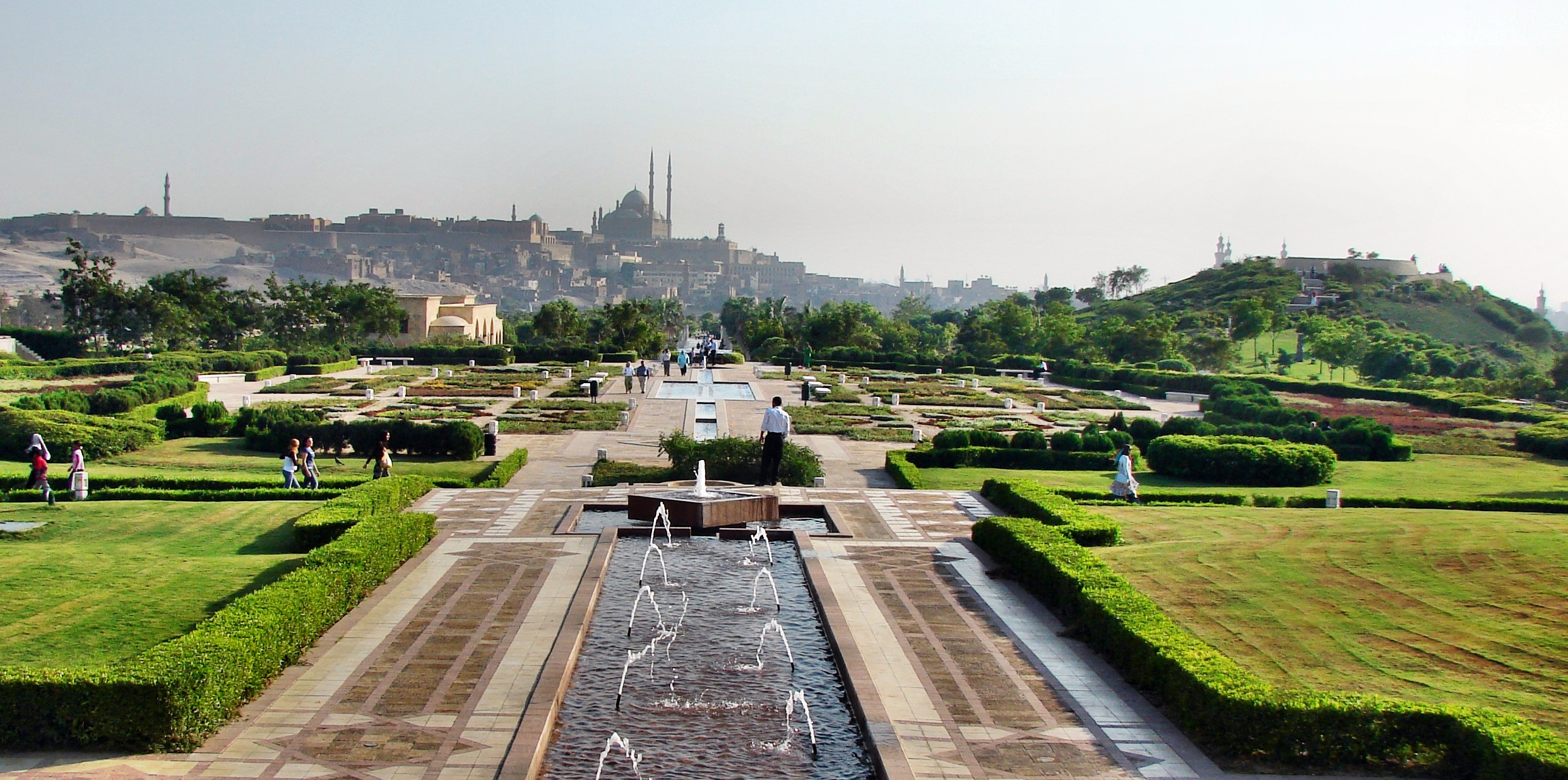
Al-Azhar Park is listed as one of the world's sixty great public spaces by the Project for Public Spaces.

Egyptian identity evolved in the span of a long period of occupation to accommodate Islam, Christianity and Judaism; and a new language, Arabic, and its spoken descendant, Egyptian Arabic, which has a significant Coptic-Egyptian substrate.

The work of early 19th century scholar Rifa'a al-Tahtawi renewed interest in Egyptian antiquity and exposed Egyptian society to Enlightenment principles. Tahtawi co-founded with education reformer Ali Mubarak a native Egyptology school that looked for inspiration to medieval Egyptian scholars, such as Suyuti and Maqrizi, who themselves studied the history, language and antiquities of Egypt.

Egypt's renaissance peaked in the late 19th and early 20th centuries through the work of people like Muhammad Abduh, Ahmed Lutfi el-Sayed, Muhammad Loutfi Goumah, Tawfiq el-Hakim, Louis Awad, Qasim Amin, Salama Moussa, Taha Hussein and Mahmoud Mokhtar. They forged a liberal path for Egypt expressed as a commitment to personal freedom, secularism and faith in science to bring progress.

=== Arts ===
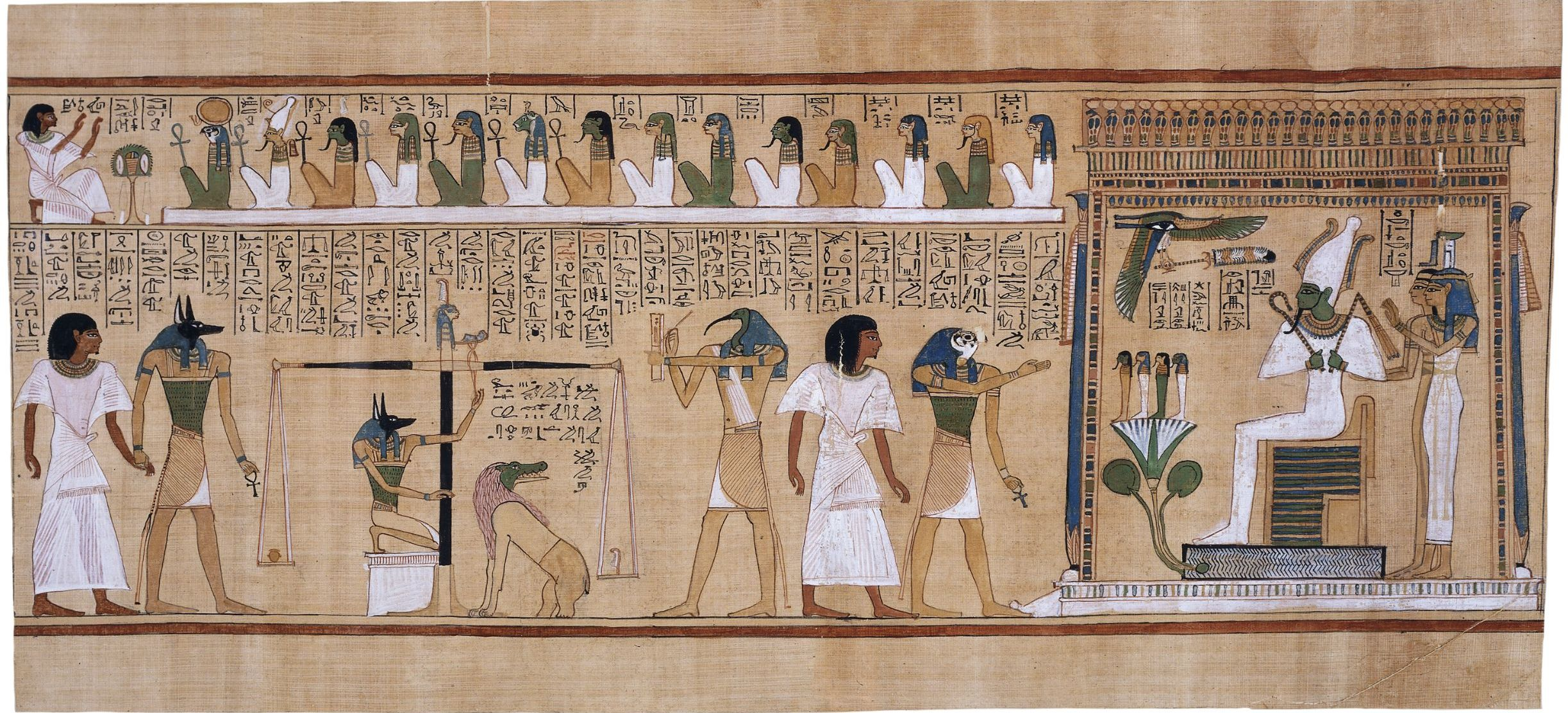
The "weighing of the heart" scene from the Book of the Dead

The Egyptians were one of the first major civilisations to codify design elements in art and architecture. Egyptian blue, also known as calcium copper silicate, is a pigment used by Egyptians for thousands of years. It is considered to be the first synthetic pigment. The wall paintings done in the service of the Pharaohs followed a rigid code of visual rules and meanings. Egyptian civilisation is renowned for its colossal pyramids, temples and monumental tombs. Well-known examples are the Pyramid of Djoser designed by ancient architect and engineer Imhotep, the Sphinx, and the temple of Abu Simbel.

Modern and contemporary Egyptian art spans disciplines from the vernacular architecture of Hassan Fathy and Ramses Wissa Wassef to the iconic sculptures of Mahmoud Mokhtar and the distinctive Coptic iconography of Isaac Fanous. Its development in the twentieth century reflected a complex dialogue between national identity, global artistic trends, and social change. Early modern Egyptian artists sought to reconnect with their national heritage through Neo-Pharaonic styles in architecture, sculpture, and painting, with artists such as Mahmoud Mokhtar and Mahmoud Sa'id incorporating symbolic references to ancient Egypt and rural life.

Later generations embraced international movements like Surrealism, Cubism, Dadaism, and abstraction, while the Art et Liberté group, including Ramses Younan, promoted individual expression and antifascist ideals. The Contemporary Art Group, with artists such as Gazbia Sirry and Abdel Hadi Al Gazzar, explored social realism and the quest for the Egyptian soul, while experimental painters and sculptors like Munir Canaan and Salah Abdel Kerim explored Abstract Expressionism and assemblage. In the latter half of the century, artists responded to political and cultural shifts with Islamic-inspired calligraphy and geometric abstraction, exemplified by the Calligraphic School of Art. Other notable artists from this era include Inji Efflatoun and Kamal Amin.

The launch of institutions such as the Townhouse Gallery in 1998 democratised art access and introduced new media forms like video and installation art, providing a platform for younger artists such as Fathi Hassan, Ghada Amer, Medhat Shafik, Moataz Nasr, and Mona Marzouk to experiment with installation, video, and photography. The 2011 Egyptian revolution ushered in a new era of politically and socially engaged art. Graffiti emerged as a prominent medium to document protests and communicate revolutionary messages, with artists like Bahia Shehab, Alaa Awad, Aya Tarek, and Ganzeer creating works that memorialised martyrs, critiqued political figures, and reclaimed public spaces.

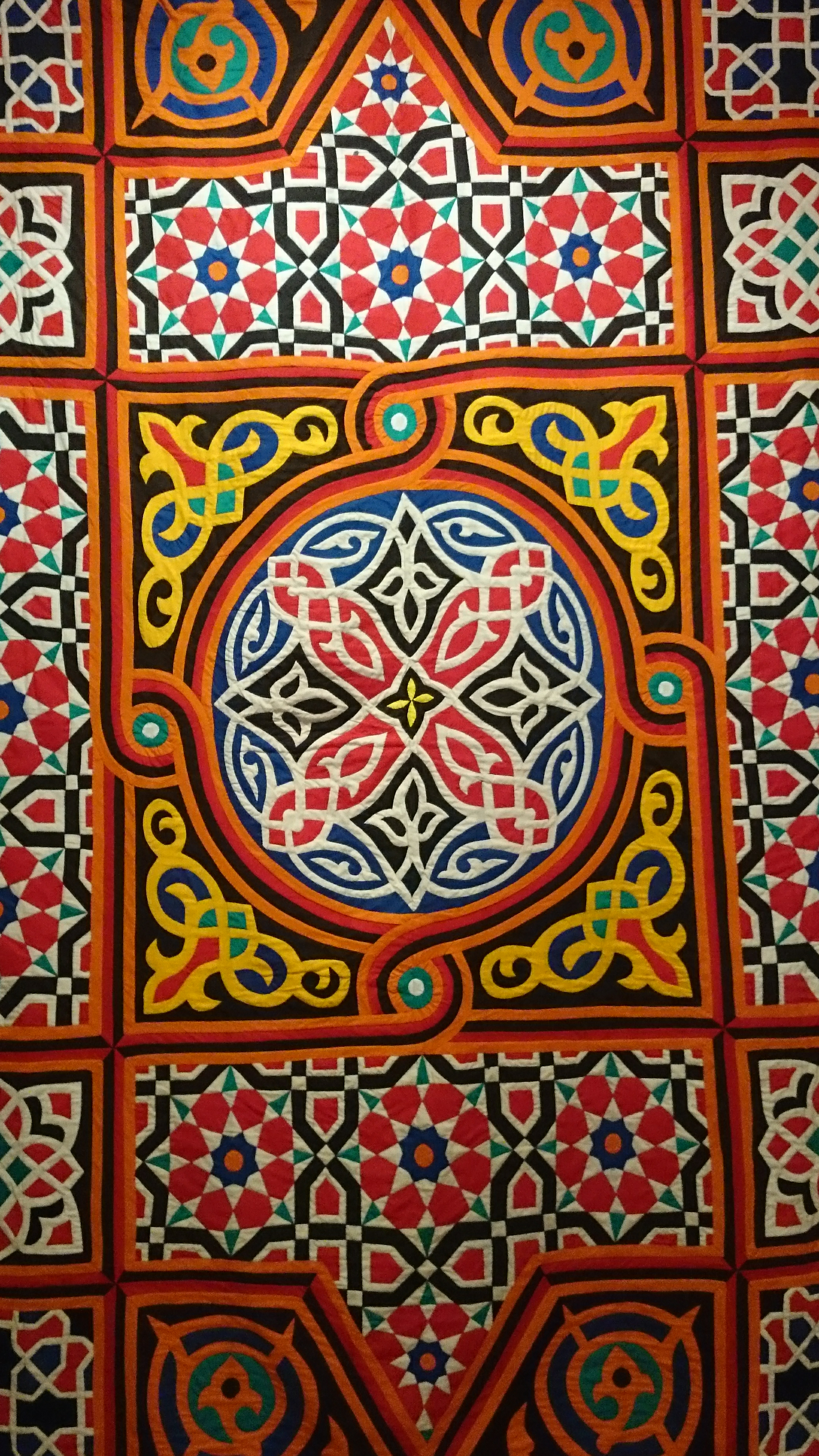
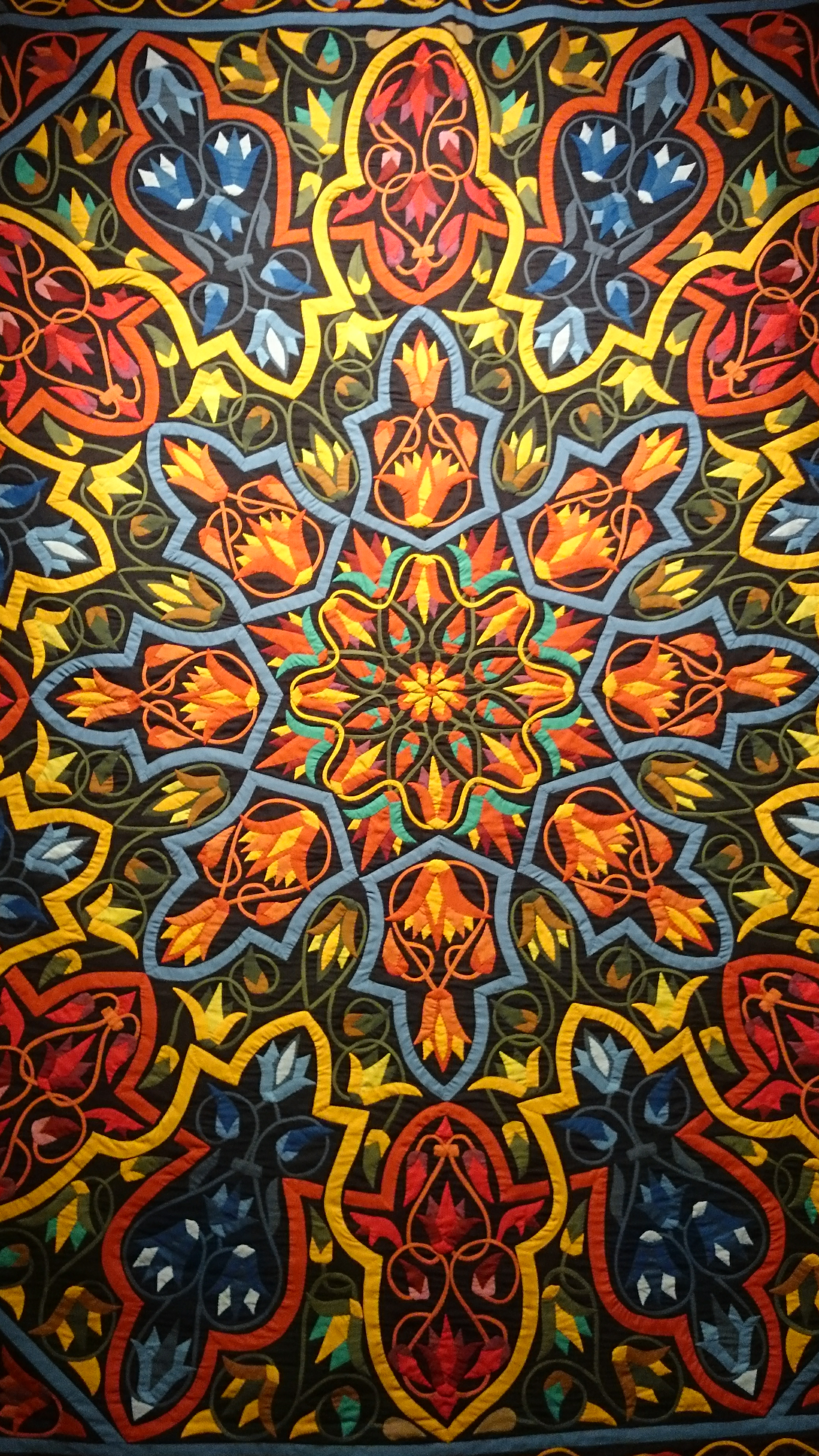
Khayamiya design motives.

Khayamiya is a traditional Egyptian appliqué textile art primarily made in Cairo's historic ShareʿEl Khayamiya (Arabic: شارع الخيامية, romanized: Shāriʿ al-Khayāmiyya, lit. 'Street of the Tentmakers'), also known as the Tentmakers Market. The craft, thought to date back to ancient Egypt, involves a labour-intensive hand-stitching process that can take weeks to complete, with designs ranging from geometric motifs to scenes drawn from Egyptian history and folklore. It was originally associated with decorated tents, but today it is also used for quilts, cushion covers, and wall hangings.

The Cairo Opera House is Egypt's main performing arts venue, with the Sayed Darwish Theatre in Alexandria and the Port Said Opera House in Port Said serving their respective cities. In 2012 the Downtown Contemporary Arts Festival (D-CAF) was launched to revitalise Cairo's cultural scene and to provide an inclusive platform for contemporary arts. It is an annual arts festival held in Cairo, Egypt, presenting a range of performances, exhibitions, and workshops in theatre, dance, and visual arts.

=== Literature ===
The literary tradition of Egypt began in ancient Egypt, making it among the earliest in human history. Writing was first used by Egyptians to record texts on materials such as papyrus and carved inscriptions. The Story of Sinuhe is perhaps its best-known work; and the autobiography has been called the earliest form of Egyptian literature. By the eighth century Egypt became part of the Muslim Arab world. Literature and libraries thrived under the new order, papyrus was replaced by paper, and calligraphy became central. In the 13th century, Ibn al-Nafis wrote Theologus Autodidactus, a theological novel with proto-science fiction elements. Literary practices such as the taqriz (commendatory blurbs) appeared in 14th-century Egypt, and Egyptian folklore contributed to One Thousand and One Nights.

In the late 19th and early 20th centuries, Egypt was central to the Nahda, the Arab cultural renaissance. Muhammad Abduh, a leading figure of Islamic modernism, co-founded the revolutionary journal Al-Urwah al-Wuthqa with Jamal al-Din al-Afghani in 1884; though quickly banned by the British, it circulated widely across the Arab world. Ahmad Shawqi pioneered the expansion of the classical qasida form, though his work remained firmly rooted in neo-classical style. Following him, poets such as Hafez Ibrahim began addressing themes of anticolonialism alongside traditional poetic subjects. Muhammad Husayn Haykal's Zaynab is considered the first modern Egyptian novel. This novel started a movement of modernising Arabic fiction. Poetry remained vibrant, with figures such as Aziz Pasha Abaza contributing classical-style verse with Pan-Arabism themes. The Abaza family produced several notable literary figures, including Fekry Pasha Abaza, Tharwat Abaza, and Desouky Pasha Abaza.

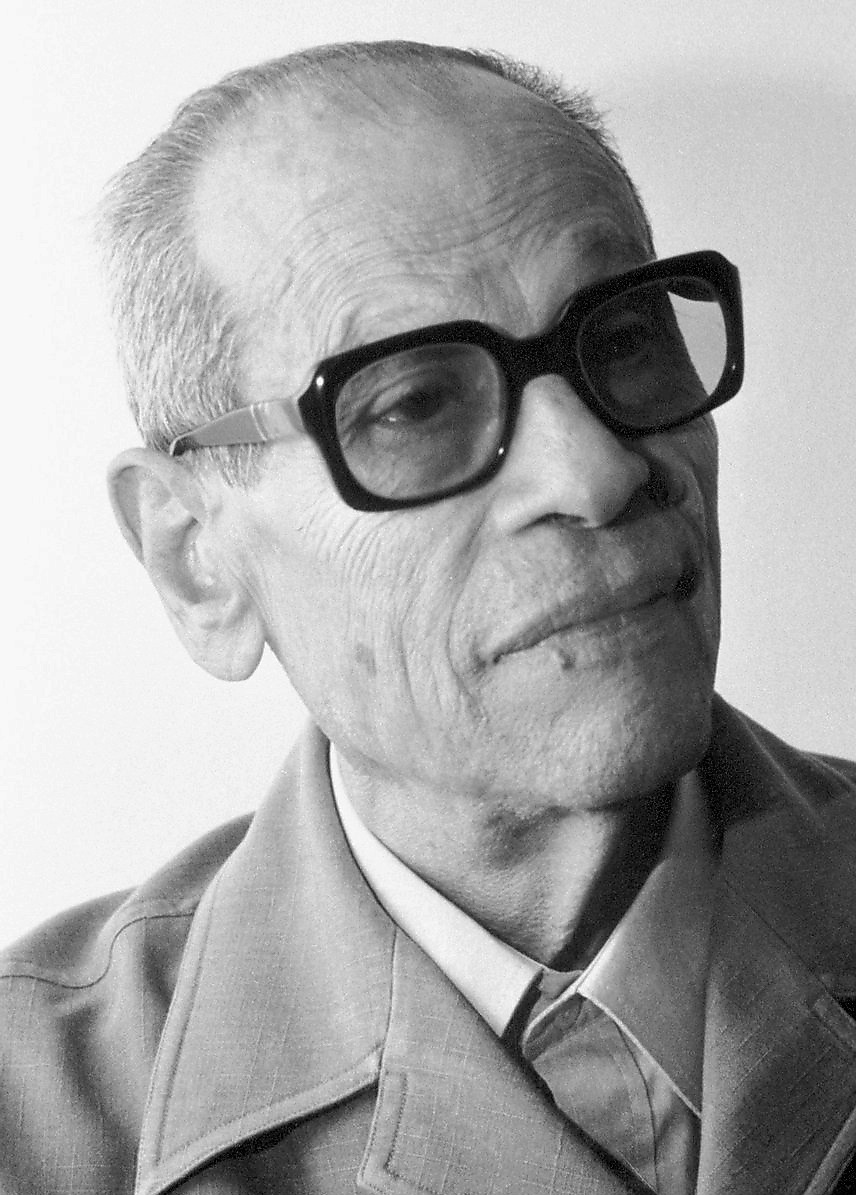
Naguib Mahfouz, the first Arabic-language writer to win the Nobel Prize in Literature

In the 20th century, modernist movements shaped Egyptian literature. Al-Madrasa al-Ḥadītha focused on the short story, while two of the most prominent figures were Taha Hussein and Naguib Mahfouz, the latter the first Egyptian and Arabic-language writer to receive the Nobel Prize in Literature. Avant-garde literary activity emerged through magazines like Galerie 68, founded by Edwar al-Kharrat, giving voice to Egypt's 1960s generation.

In the 1990s, Egyptian literature responded to socio-economic changes such as urbanisation and rising living costs, focusing on isolated individuals in a changing society, exemplified by Mustafa Zikri, Nura Amin, and May Telmissany. This era also saw the rise of women writers, often called kitabat al-banat ("girls' writing"), with shorter, first-person narratives.

Egyptians constitute the largest share of shortlisted authors for the International Prize for Arabic Fiction, with Bahaa Taher's Sunset Oasis winning the inaugural edition in 2008, followed the next year by Youssef Ziedan's Azazeel. Other notable contemporary authors include Radwa Ashour, acclaimed for the Granada trilogy; Ahdaf Soueif, whose English-language novel The Map of Love was shortlisted for the Booker Prize in 1999; Ahmed Khaled Tawfik, who introduced horror and science fiction to Egyptian literature with his Ma Waraa al-Tabiaa series; and Ahmed Mourad, known for bestselling novels such as Vertigo and The Blue Elephant. Feminist themes are explored by Nawal El Saadawi and Alifa Rifaat, while vernacular poetry is represented by Ahmed Fouad Negm, Salah Jaheen, and Abdel Rahman el-Abnudi.

=== Media ===
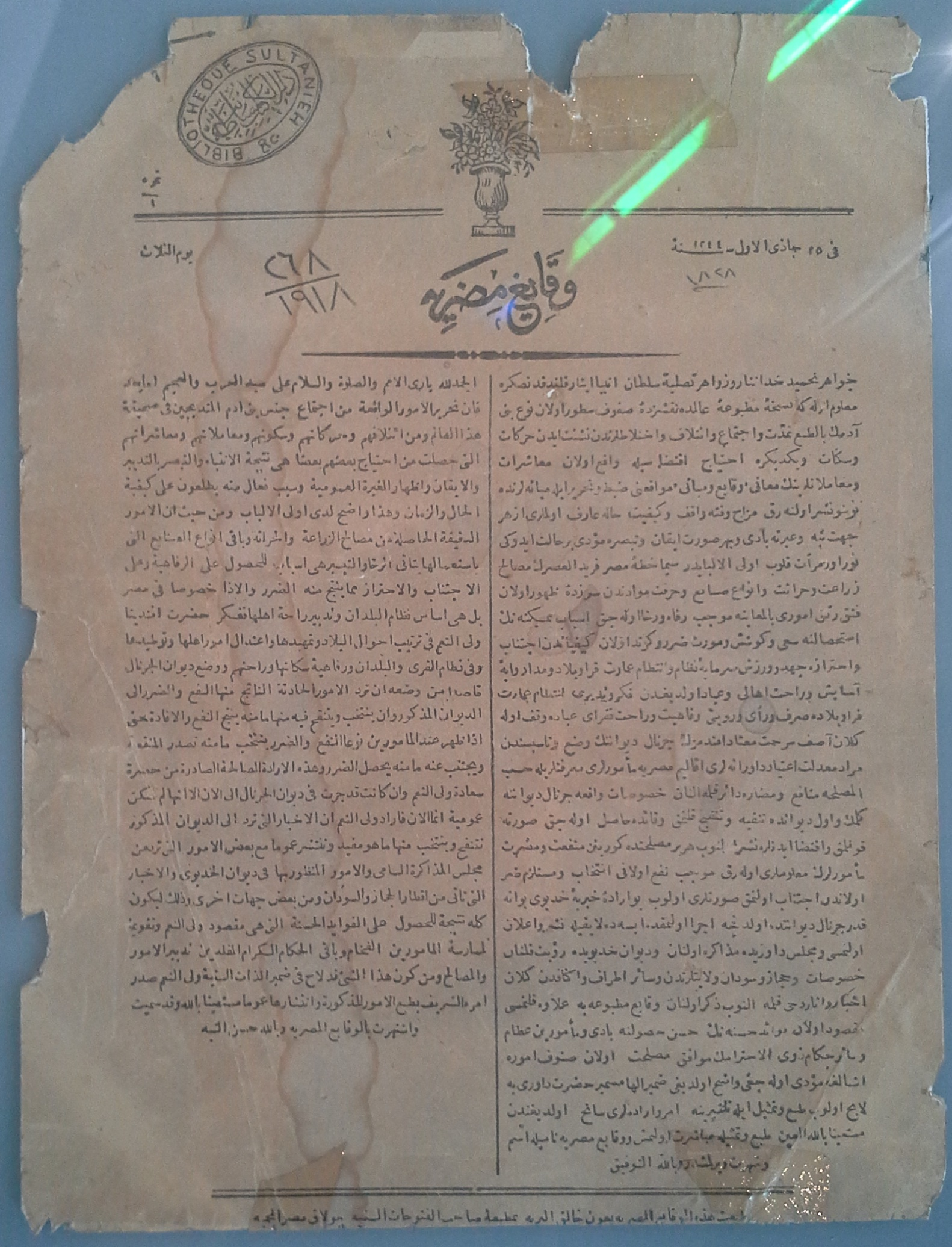
The first issue of Al-Waqa'i' al-Misriyya, printed in 1828 by the Amiriya Press. It and its predecessor Jurnal al-Khidiw are the oldest Arabic-language newspapers.

Egypt is a major regional media hub, with its press among the most influential in the Arab world. The printing press was first introduced to Egypt by Napoleon Bonaparte during his French Campaign in Egypt and Syria. Alexandria was the centre of Egyptian journalism for much of the 1800s, with many literary journals starting there before moving to Cairo. By the 1890s, Cairo had become dominant, hosting 65% of publications, while Alexandria accounted for 28%. The written press in Egypt today is highly diverse, with more than 600 newspapers, journals, and magazines. The three leading state-owned press institutions are Al-Ahram, Al-Akhbar and Dar Al-Tahrir, the latter being a major publishing house that issues a wide range of newspapers and magazines in different languages, including Al-Gomhuria, The Egyptian Gazette, Le Progrès Egyptien, among others.

Egypt was the first country in the region to introduce radio broadcasts to a wide population in 1926, initially through private short-wave stations with limited range, primarily located between Cairo and Alexandria. The official Egyptian radio service launched on 31 May 1934, with the first broadcast featuring Muhammad Rifat, a Quran reciter. Following the 1952 Egyptian Revolution, radio became a central tool of state communication and regional influence. Under President Gamal Abdel Nasser, Egypt developed the Voice of the Arabs (Arabic: صوت العرب, romanized: Sawt El Arab) service, launched in the 1950s as one of the most prominent Arabic-language broadcasts of its time. Initially modest in size, Egypt's radio system was rapidly expanded by the revolutionary government. It was used to promote Arab unity, strengthen Egypt's leadership role in the region, often calling for solidarity and revolutionary action, particularly during the 1950s and 1960s. Contemporary radio in Egypt is largely operated by the Egyptian Radio and Television Union (ERTU), established in 1970, which manages multiple national and local stations. Private FM stations also exist, but state radio remains the most widespread. Programming includes news, cultural content, educational programmes.

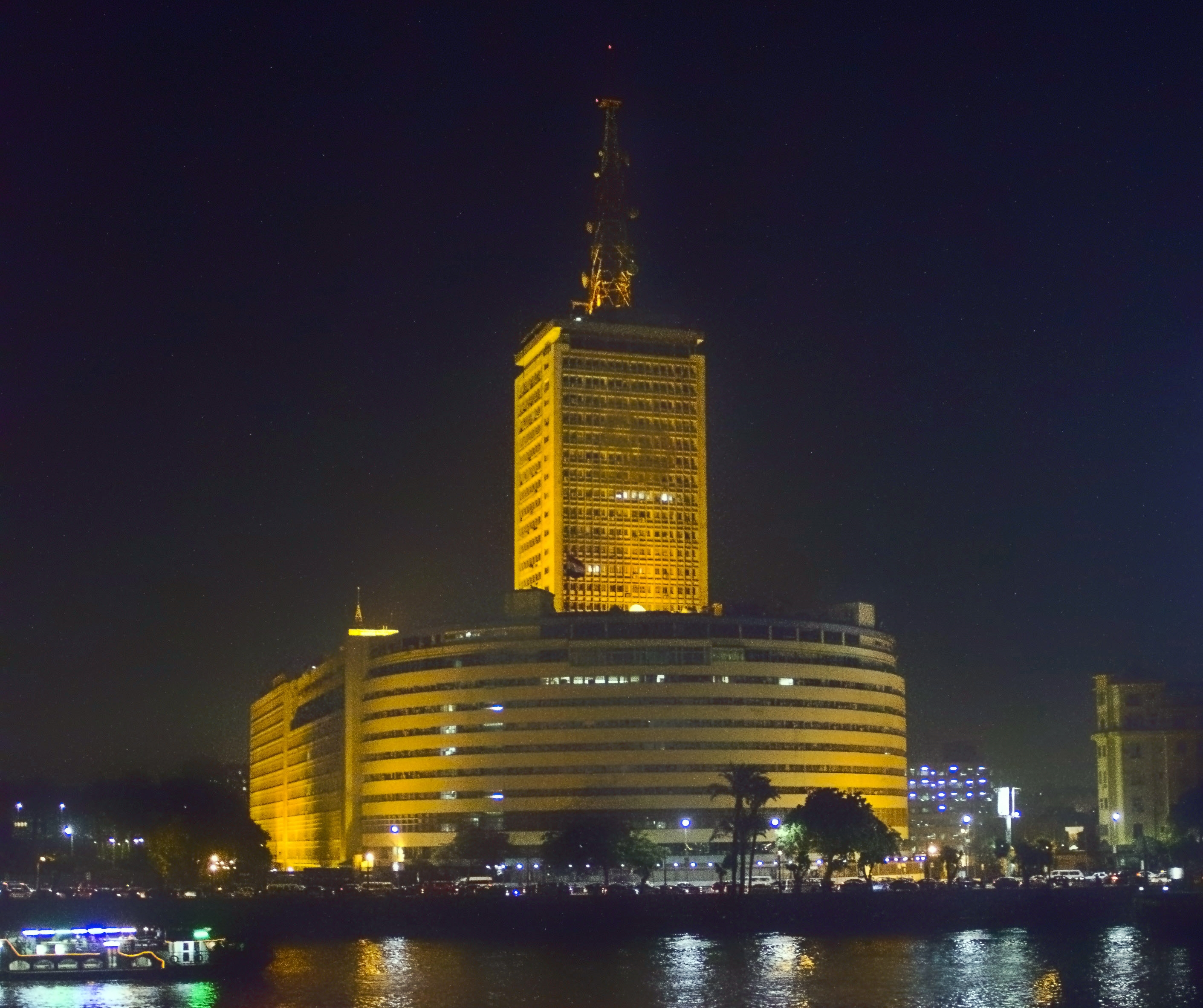
The Maspero building in Cairo, headquarters of the Egyptian Radio and Television Union

Egyptian television began in 1960 when Channel 1 launched with Quran readings and a speech by President Nasser, followed by Channel 2 in 1961 offering cultural, informational, and instructional programmes. Over the following decades, additional channels were launched regionally. In the 21st century, Egypt's television and film industry continue to supply much of the region through Cairo's Media Production City. Television remains the most popular medium in the country, with ERTU operating two national terrestrial channels, six local terrestrial channels covering all 27 governorates, three satellite channels, and over ten specialised channels, including news, sport, culture, education, and entertainment. In addition, numerous private satellite television channels operate alongside the state networks. Egypt is a major force in satellite broadcasting, being the first Arab country to launch its own satellite, Nilesat.

=== Cinema ===
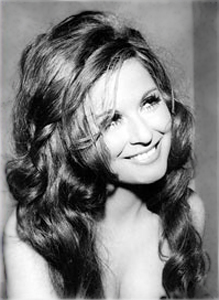
Soad Hosny

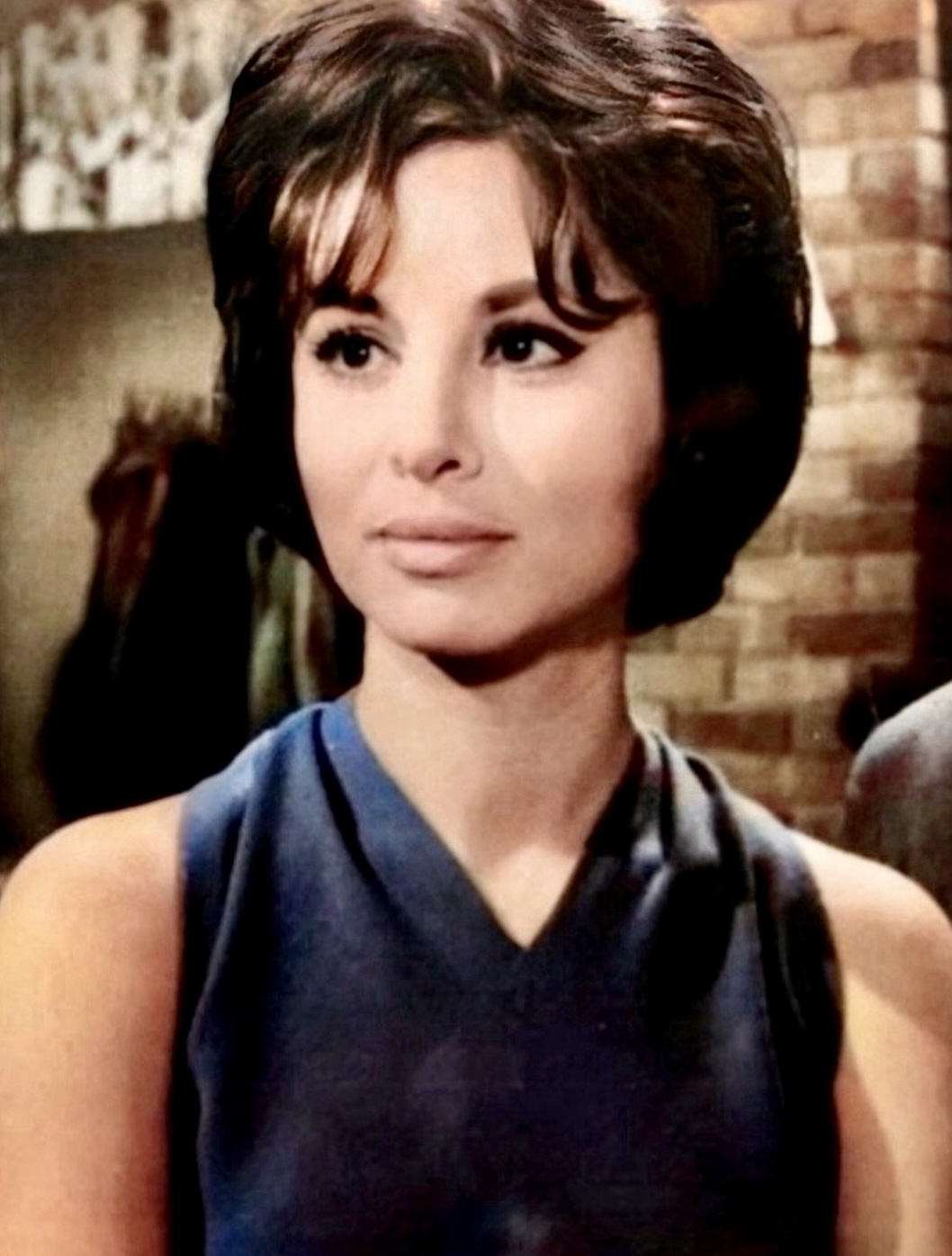
Faten Hamama

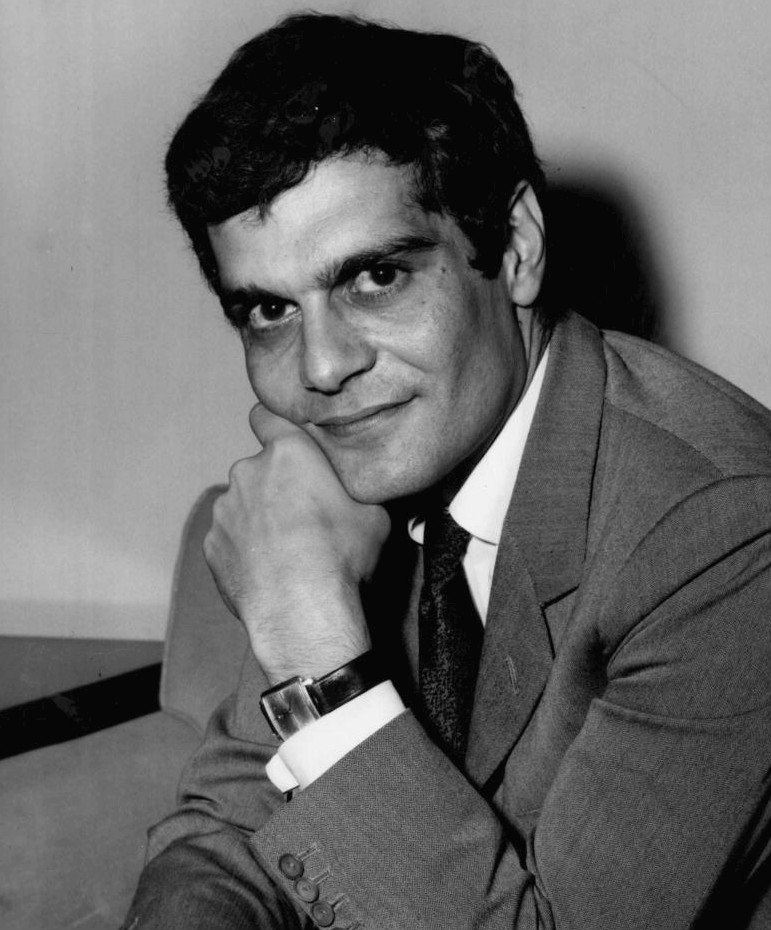
Omar Sharif

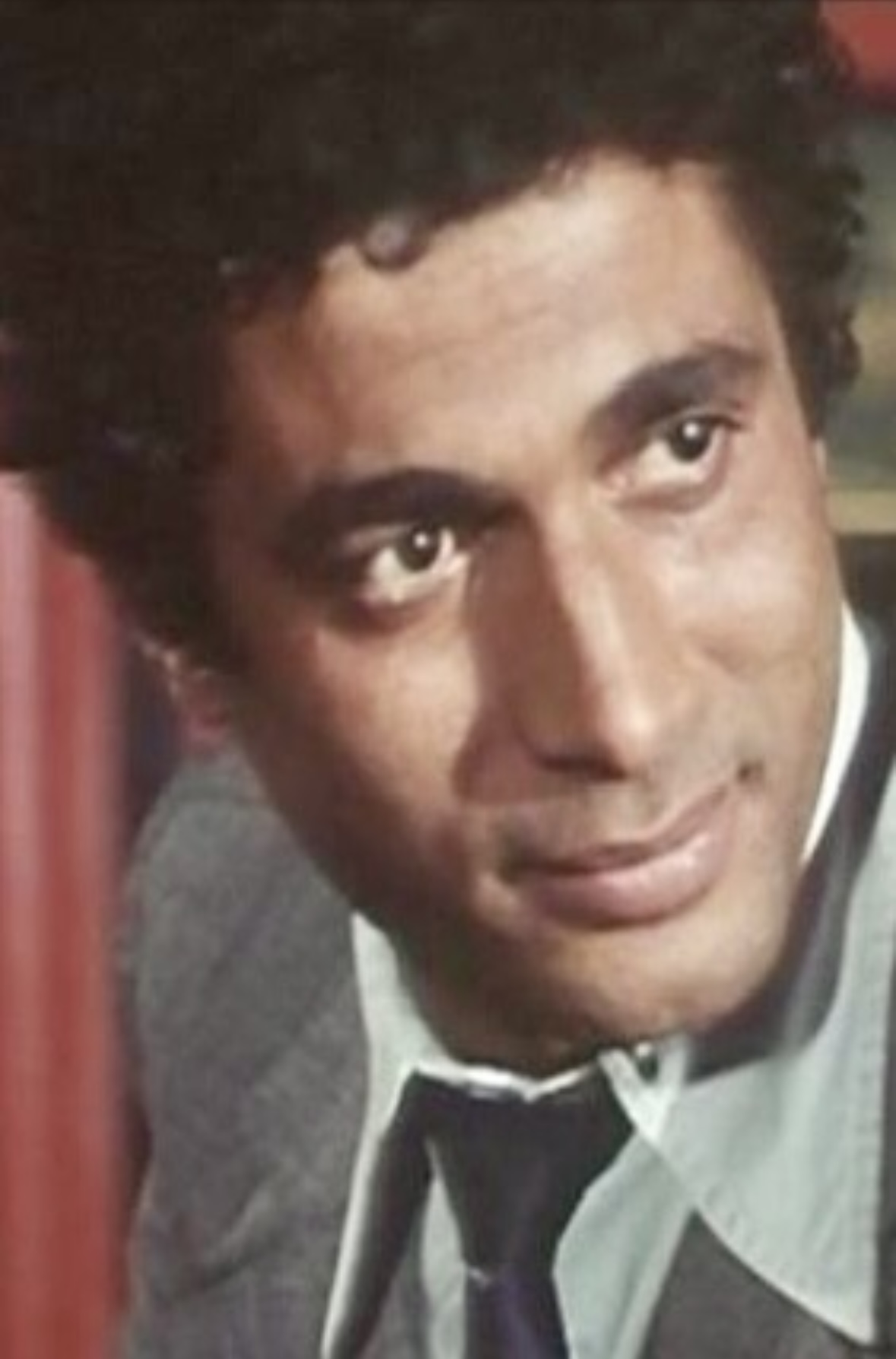
Ahmed Zaki

Egyptian cinema, the oldest in Africa and the Arab world, began in 1896 with film screenings in Alexandria, Cairo, and Port Said. Early production started in 1907 with short documentaries, and the first feature films appeared in 1917, directed by Mohammed Karim. By the 1920s and 1930s, the country's film scene expanded with productions such as Layla and Sons of Aristocrats, the first Egyptian talkie. In 1936, Studio Misr, financed by industrialist Talaat Harb, emerged as the leading Egyptian studio, a role the company retained for three decades. For over 100 years, more than 4,000 films have been produced in Egypt, three quarters of the total Arab production.

The industry has been a dominant cultural force in the Arab world since its inception, earning the nickname "Arab Hollywood" and "Hollywood of the East". Its golden age, spanning the 1940s to the 1960s, saw Egypt become the world's third-largest film producer, with hundreds of films across genres achieving widespread regional popularity. Iconic filmmakers such as Youssef Chahine and Henry Barakat, and celebrated actors including Faten Hamama, helped establish Egyptian cinema as a major influence on Arab cultural identity. Today, Egyptian films continue to reach audiences across the Arab world and beyond, maintaining the country's historic role as a central hub for Arabic-language cinema.

Egypt hosts several film festivals, which have become important platforms for both local and international filmmakers. The Cairo International Film Festival, established in 1976, showcases a range of films from dramas to experimental works and attracts filmmakers and audiences from around the world. It is listed by the International Federation of Film Producers' Associations as one of the 11 competitive film festivals in the world. The Luxor African Film Festival highlights African cinema, while the El Gouna Film Festival presents Arabic and international films. Other notable events include the Ismailia International Film Festival, which focuses on social and environmental themes, and the Alexandria Short Film Festival, which features narrative, documentary, and animated short films.

The number of cinemas increased with the emergence of talking films, and reached 395 in 1958. This number began to decline after the establishment of television in 1960 and the establishment of the public sector in cinemas in 1962. The cinema count fell to 297 in 1965, then to 141 in 1995, due to the circulation of films through video equipment though the boom of the film industry in this period. Due to laws and procedures that encouraged investment in the establishment of private cinemas, they increased again, especially in commercial centres. Their number reached 200 in 2001 and 400 in 2009.

=== Music ===
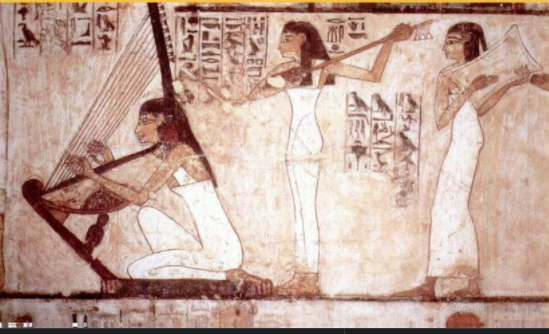
An ancient Egyptian mural of people playing music.

Egyptian music is a rich mixture of indigenous, Mediterranean, African and Western elements. It has been an integral part of Egyptian culture since antiquity. The ancient Egyptians credited one of their gods Hathor with the invention of music, which Osiris in turn used as part of his effort to civilise the world. Egyptians used music instruments since then.

Contemporary Egyptian music has its roots in the work of early artists such as Abdu al-Hamuli, Almaz, and Mahmoud Osman, whose contributions shaped and inspired later generations. It was recorded as early as the 1910s, with a thriving classical tradition developing in Cairo by the 1930s, blending indigenous folk influences with Western elements and producing iconic 20th-century stars such as Sayed Darwish, Umm Kulthum, Mohammed Abdel Wahab, Abdel Halim Hafez, and Baligh Hamdi, many of whom became central to both popular culture and national identity.

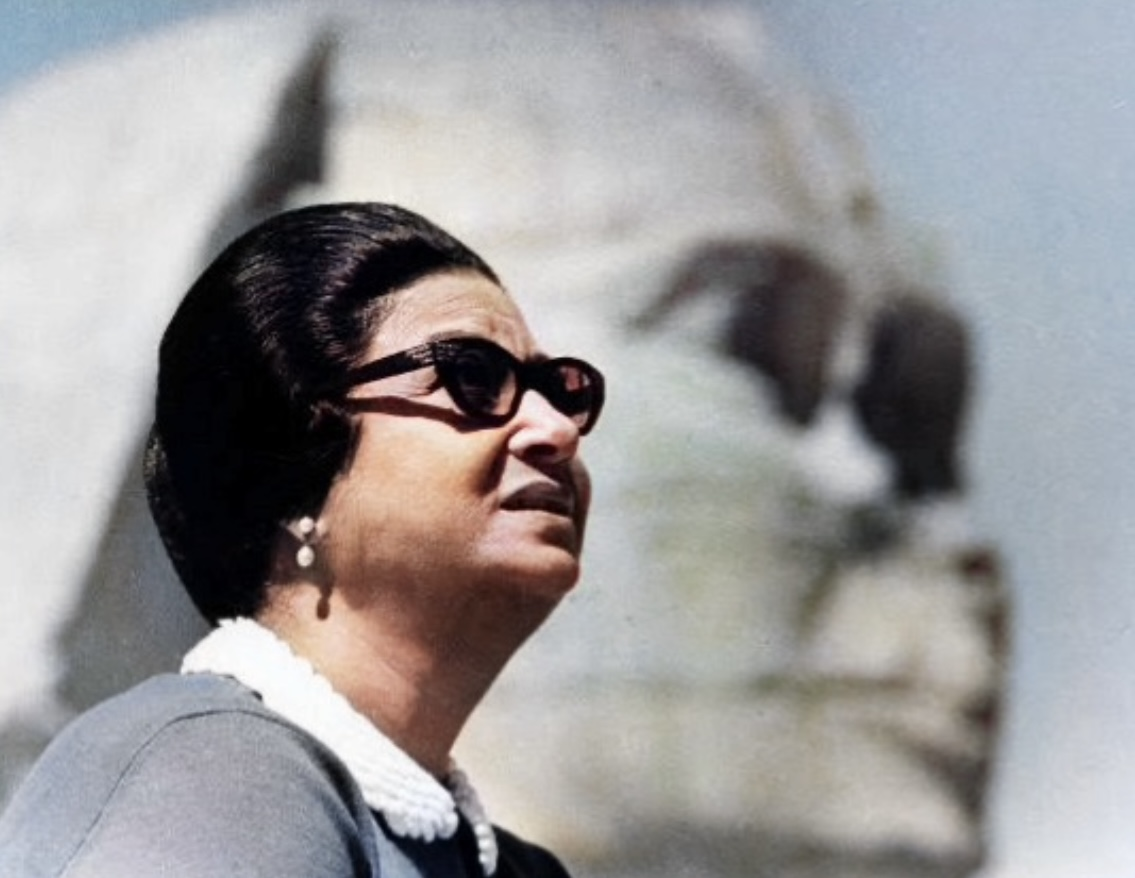
Umm Kulthum, an icon of Egyptian music, often referred to as "Egypt's Fourth Pyramid". In 2023, Rolling Stone ranked Umm Kulthum at number 61 on its list of the 200 Greatest Singers of All Time.

The music scene evolved from the golden age of mid-20th century modern Egyptian classical heavyweights, to the rise of Egyptian pop in the 1980s–90s with artists such as Amr Diab, Hisham Abbas, and Mostafa Amar. At the same time, Omar Khairat emerged as a leading composer and pianist, blending Western classical music with distinctive Egyptian influences. He has written numerous acclaimed film scores and symphonic works which has made him one of Egypt's most internationally respected contemporary musicians.

In the 21st century, globalisation and the 2011 revolution spurred diverse underground movements, with musicians and bands like Ramy Essam and Cairokee addressing identity and political themes. Mahraganat emerged from working-class communities to become mainstream, developing out of shaabi music, which has been part of Egyptian culture since the 1970s with pioneers such as Ahmed Adaweya. Meanwhile, Egyptian rap, trap, and techno gained prominence through artists like Abyusif, Marwan Pablo, and Wegz.

In recent years, Egypt's music scene has seen a generational shift, with new artists emerging as leading figures alongside established icons. According to Spotify Wrapped 2024, seven of the ten most-streamed songs in Egypt came from newer performers experimenting with rap, R&B, electronic fusions, and street music alongside traditional influences. Rising artists such as Eslam Kabonga, Shehab, TUL8TE, Mahmoud El Leithy, and Essam Sasa gained significant popularity, while established acts like Marwan Pablo, Sherine, Cairokee, and Tamer Ashour also remained highly streamed. The trend coincided with an 85 percent rise in local music consumption. Egypt's music industry has seen rapid international growth through streaming platforms, with Spotify reporting a fivefold rise in royalties since 2022, over 90 percent of earnings going to independent artists, and more than 80 percent of revenue coming from listeners outside Egypt.

=== Dances ===
Egypt has a rich tradition of folk dances that reflect the country's regional and cultural diversity. In Lower Egypt, dances such as ghawazi el sonbat (غوازي سنباط), raqs el hagala (رقص الحجلة), and welad el sayala (أولاد السيالة) incorporate colourful costumes and props to tell a story. For example, welad el sayala, performed in Alexandria, uses pocket knives and chairs to represent the lives and celebrations of fishermen and their communities. In Upper Egypt, dances include stick dances such as raqs el assaya (رقص العصا) and tahtib (تحطيب), which are traditionally performed by men at weddings and festive occasions. These dances often symbolise strength and skill, with tahtib in particular originating from ancient martial arts traditions. Nubian dance, originating in Nubian communities in Egypt's south, are characterised by rhythmic arm movements and upbeat tempos, often accompanied by the tambourine duff.

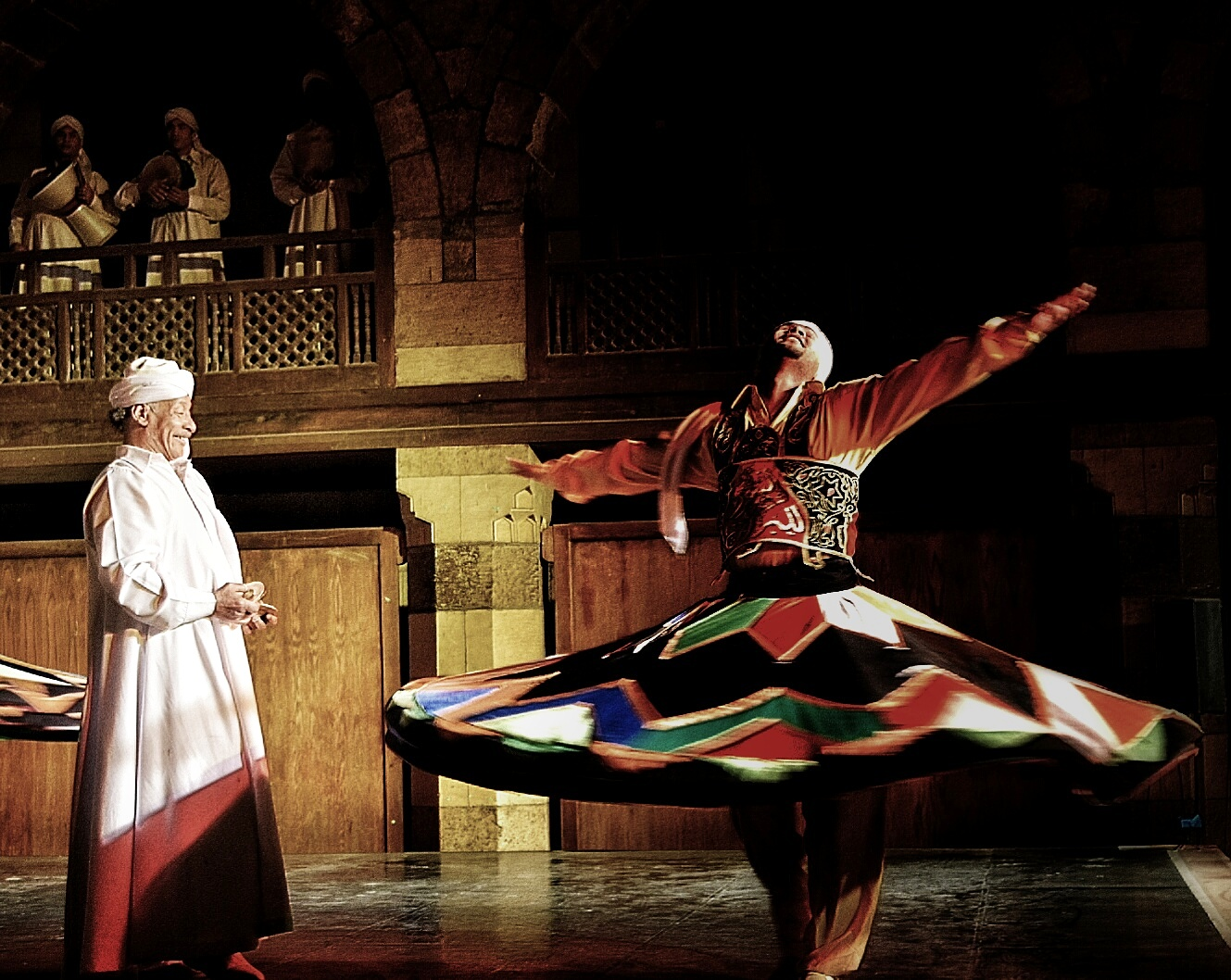
A tanoura dancer performing

Egypt is often considered the home of belly dance. Egyptian belly dance has two main styles: raqs baladi (رقص بلدي) and raqs sharqi (رقص شرقي). There are also numerous folkloric and character dances that may be part of an Egyptian-style belly dancer's repertoire, as well as the modern shaabi dance (رقص شعبي), which shares some elements with raqs baladi. Belly dancing emphasises fluid movements of the hips, belly, and arms, often performed to the rhythm of the tabla drum, and is closely associated with femininity and performance in cinema and theatre.

Other prominent forms of Egyptian dance include Sufi tanoura (رقص التنورة) dancing, which involves multilayered skirts and is performed both as a spiritual practice to achieve trance-like states and as a cultural performance at festivals and tourist sites.

=== Museums ===
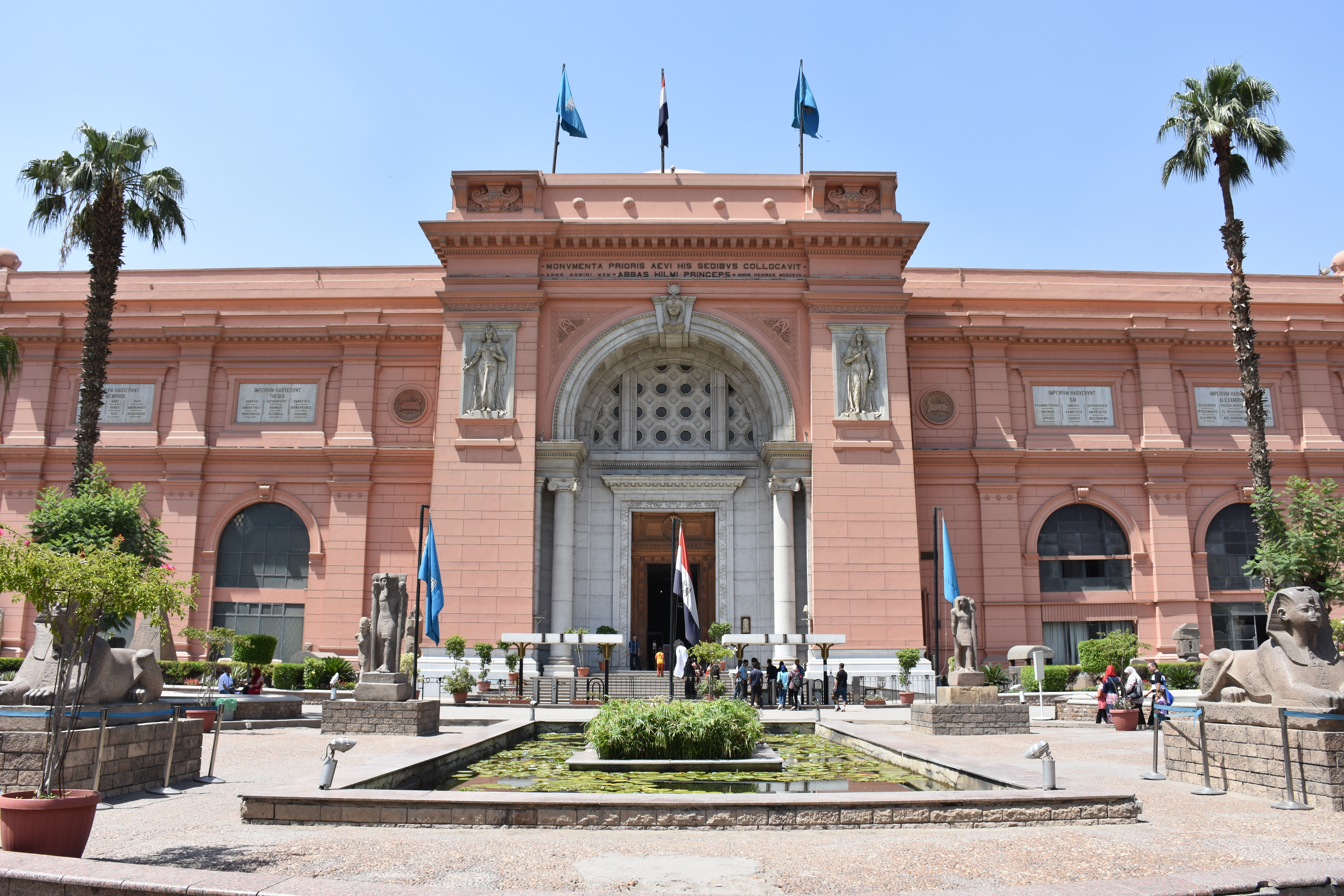
The Egyptian Museum in Cairo

Egypt is home to one of the world's oldest civilisations. It has engaged with numerous cultures and nations throughout its history and has experienced a vast array of eras, from the prehistoric age to modern times, encompassing periods such as ancient Egypt, Ptolemaic, Roman, the Middle Ages, Ottoman, and the Alawiyya dynasty.

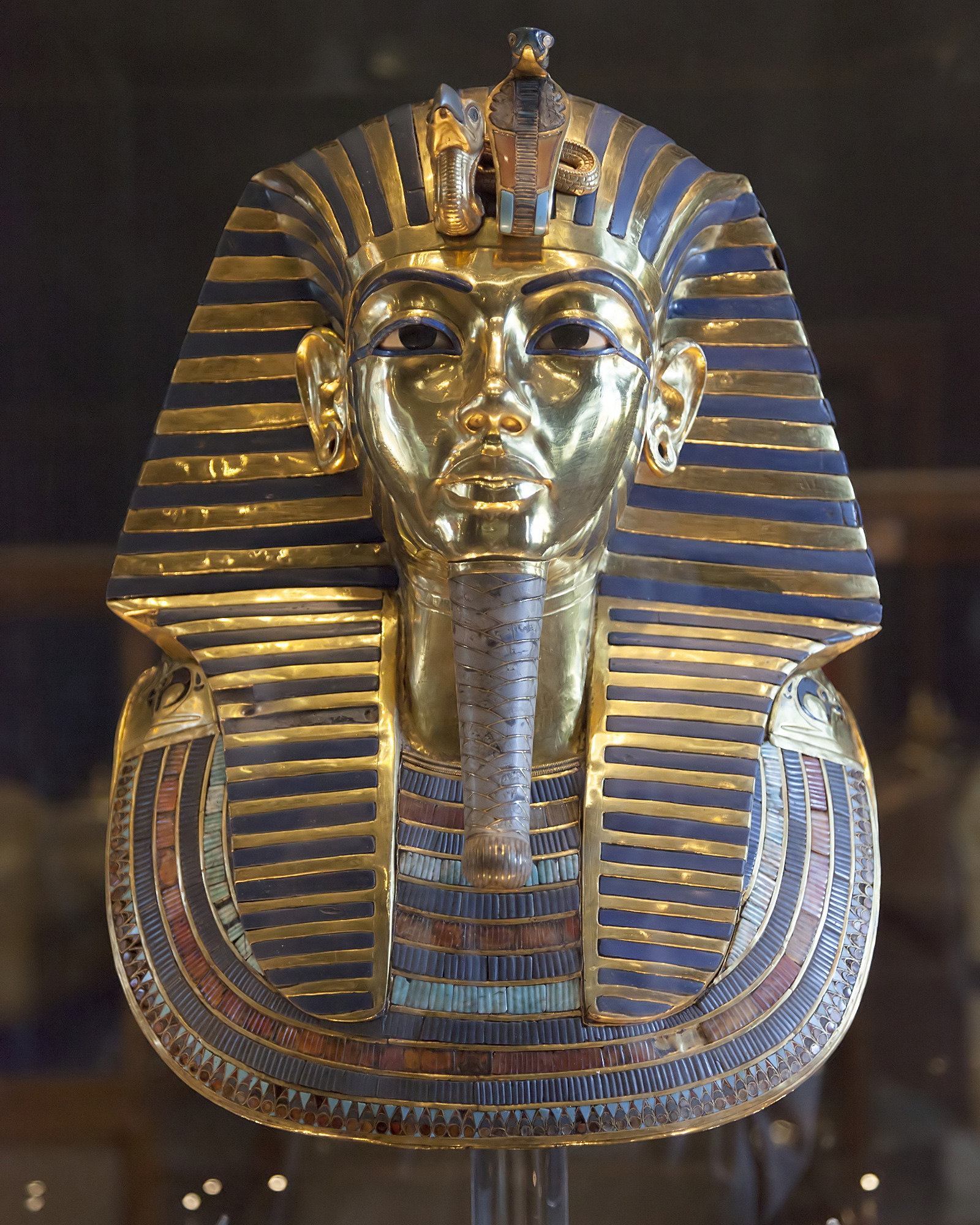
Tutankhamun's burial mask is one of the major attractions of the Egyptian Museum.

Notable museums in Egypt include the Egyptian Museum in Cairo, which houses over 120,000 items and is one of the world's largest museums as well as the first national museum in the Middle East, opened in 1902; the National Museum of Egyptian Civilization, home to 50,000 artefacts from various eras and the resting place of 22 ancient Egyptian kings and queens relocated there in 2021 during the Pharaohs' Golden Parade; and the Abdeen Palace Museum, one of Egypt's most famous royal palaces, which contains five museums showcasing arms, royal belongings, silverware, historical documents, and presidential gifts.

The Grand Egyptian Museum is a museum housing the largest collection of ancient Egyptian artefacts in the world. It is the largest museum in the world dedicated to a single civilisation. The museum is sited on 50 hectares (120 acres) of land approximately two kilometres (1.2 miles) from the Giza Necropolis and is part of a new master plan for the plateau. It features a six-storey atrium with the 82-ton Statue of Ramesses II and a grand staircase, while its galleries display artefacts spanning ancient Egypt's history. The Tutankhamun exhibition showcases 5,600 objects from his tomb, including his gold mask and royal regalia. It is arranged around three central themes, life, death, and the afterlife, and features two opposing pathways: a chronological journey through his life and reign, and a forensic exploration of his tomb and excavation. The museum opened on 1 November 2025.

=== Festivals ===
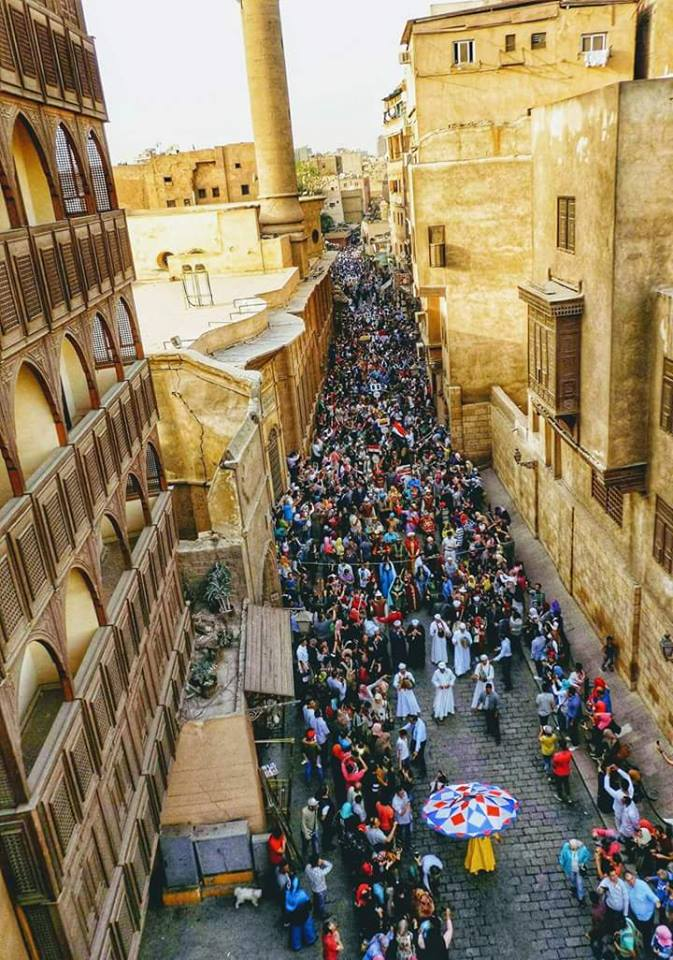
Moulid celebrations in Muizz Street, Cairo

Egypt observes several religious Muslim and Christian festivals as public holidays. These include Coptic Christmas, Eid al-Fitr, Eid al-Adha, Islamic New Year, the Day of Arafah, and Moulid al-Nabawi.

Sham Ennessim (شم النسيم) is an annual festival in Egypt marking the beginning of spring, celebrated by Egyptians of all religions and recognised as an official public holiday. It is observed on Easter Monday, the day after Easter, typically between the Egyptian months of Paremoude (April) and Pashons (May). The festival is traditionally celebrated outdoors, with picnics in public gardens, along the Nile, or at the zoo. Typical foods include fesikh, lettuce, green onions, and lupin beans. Boiled eggs are often coloured and eaten or exchanged as gifts. It is generally held that Sham Ennessim is a continuation of early forms of springtime festivities dating back over 4,500 years.

Moulids, or saint's festivals, are a long-standing tradition throughout Egypt, celebrating both Islamic and Christian saints. The majority are Islamic and typically feature dhikr, the ritual chanting and recitation of prayers, as well as performances by Sufi groups, including music and spiritual gatherings. Christian moulids follow comparable festive patterns. These events blend religious devotion with communal celebration, often centring on a shrine or mosque where pilgrims seek blessings through prayer, recitation of religious texts, circumambulation, and other acts of veneration. They are also social and cultural occasions, with food, games, rides, and temporary stalls set up in the surrounding streets. Major festivals, such as the Moulid Abu El Haggag (مولد أبو الحجاج) in Luxor, attract thousands of participants. It features boats and shrines paraded through the city in his honour, a tradition with origins dating back to ancient Egypt. The procession closely resembles the rituals of the Opet Festival.

=== Cuisine ===
Koshary, one of Egypt's national dishes

Egyptian cuisine draws on the agricultural traditions of the Nile Valley and Delta, and makes heavy use of poultry, legumes, vegetables, and fruits. Staple dishes include mahshi, rice-stuffed vegetables and grape leaves, falafel, mainly known locally as ta'ameya, shawarma, kabab, and kofta. Traditional Egyptian specialities include ful medames, mashed fava beans; feteer, a flaky, layered pie with various fillings; hawawshi, spiced minced meat baked inside bread; molokhiya, a jute leaf stew; and koshary, a mix of lentils, rice, and pasta, which is recognised as intangible cultural heritage by UNESCO. Many Egyptian dishes are traditionally prepared hands-on at home, often slow-cooked, based on the culinary practices of rural kitchens passed down through generations, including stews such as bamia, okra stew; qolqas, taro root stew; and baked dishes, such as rozz me'ammar, a baked rice dish made with milk, butter, and eshta; as well as macarona bil-bechamel, a pasta bake with penne, spiced meat sauce, and béchamel.

Bread holds a central place in Egyptian cuisine and dining traditions, with more than 60 different types found across the country. Eish baladi, a round, whole-wheat flatbread, is a staple of nearly every meal and is commonly used as an edible utensil for dipping and scooping rather than simply accompanying dishes. Cheesemaking in Egypt dates back to the First Dynasty, with Domiati cheese being the most widely consumed today. Meat plays an important role in Egyptian cuisine, with poultry such as squab, chicken, duck, quail, and goose being common, alongside lamb and beef for grilling and stews. Cured meats such as bastirma and sogoq are traditionally consumed. Egyptian bastirma is made from salted, spiced, and air-dried beef or water buffalo, and sogoq, a spicy sausage of ground beef stuffed into thin casings and left to dry and ferment. Fish, especially tilapia and mullet, are widely consumed, with seafood in general being particularly prevalent in coastal cities like Alexandria, Suez, and Port Said. A large portion of Egyptian cuisine is vegetarian due to limited grazing land, historical agricultural practices, and the religious customs of Coptic Christians, who periodically observe a vegan diet.

The cuisine commonly features an assortment of spices and aromatics such as cumin, coriander, cardamom, chilli, aniseed, bay leaves, dill, parsley, garlic, ginger, cinnamon, mint, and cloves, with cumin being the most commonly used. Popular desserts include baqlawa, basbousa, kunafa, and qatayef, often featuring dates, honey, syrup, nuts and semolina. Tea is the national drink, while coffee is also common and is traditionally prepared in the Turkish style. Other popular beverages in Egypt include karkadeh, hibiscus tea; 'asir asab, sugarcane juice; 'erq sous, liquorice juice; kharob, carob juice; amar eddin, apricot drink; and sobia, sweet coconut milk drink. Beer is the most popular alcoholic beverage, including traditional types like bouza, made from barley and bread and consumed since the Predynastic era.

=== Sports ===
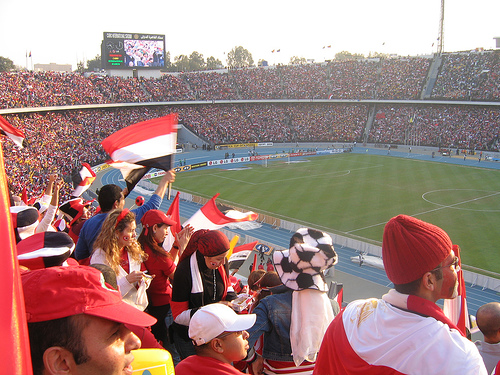
A crowd at Cairo Stadium watching the Egypt national football team

Football is the most popular national sport of Egypt. The Cairo Derby is one of the fiercest derbies in Africa, and the BBC picked it as one of the 7 toughest derbies in the world. Al Ahly is the most successful club of the 20th century in the African continent according to CAF, closely followed by their rivals Zamalek SC. They are known as the "African Club of the Century". With twenty titles, Al Ahly is currently the world's most successful club in terms of international trophies, surpassing Italy's A.C. Milan and Argentina's Boca Juniors, both having eighteen.

The Egyptian national football team, known as the Pharaohs, won the African Cup of Nations seven times, including three times in a row in 2006, 2008, and 2010. Considered the most successful African national team and one which has reached the top 10 of the FIFA world rankings, Egypt has qualified for the FIFA World Cup four times. Two goals from star player Mohamed Salah in their last qualifying game took Egypt through to the 2018 FIFA World Cup. The Egyptian youth national team Young Pharaohs won the bronze medal of the 2001 FIFA youth world cup in Argentina. Egypt was 4th place in the football tournament in the 1928 and the 1964 (Note: Egypt participated as the United Arab Republic in the 1964 Summer Olympics.) Olympics.

Squash and tennis are other popular sports in Egypt. The Egyptian squash team has been competitive in international championships since the 1930s. Amr Shabana, Ali Farag and Ramy Ashour are Egypt's best players and all were ranked the world's number one squash player. Egypt has won the Squash World Championships five times, with the last title being in 2019.

Egypt hosted the IHF World Men's Handball Championship in 1999 and hosted it again in 2021. In 2001, the national handball team achieved its best result in the tournament by reaching fourth place. Egypt has won the African Men's Handball Championship five times, being the best team in Africa. Egypt won the Mediterranean Games in 2013, the Beach Handball World Championships in 2004 and the Summer Youth Olympics in 2010. Among all African nations, the Egyptian national basketball team holds the record for best performance at the Basketball World Cup and at the Summer Olympics. Further, the team has won a record number of 16 medals at the African Championship.

Egypt has taken part in the Summer Olympic Games since 1912 and has hosted several other international competitions, including the first Mediterranean Games in 1951, the 1991 All-Africa Games, the 2009 FIFA U-20 World Cup and the 1953, 1965 and 2007 editions of the Pan Arab Games.

== See also ==
- Outline of Egypt
  - Outline of ancient Egypt
