= Ancient Egyptian cuisine =

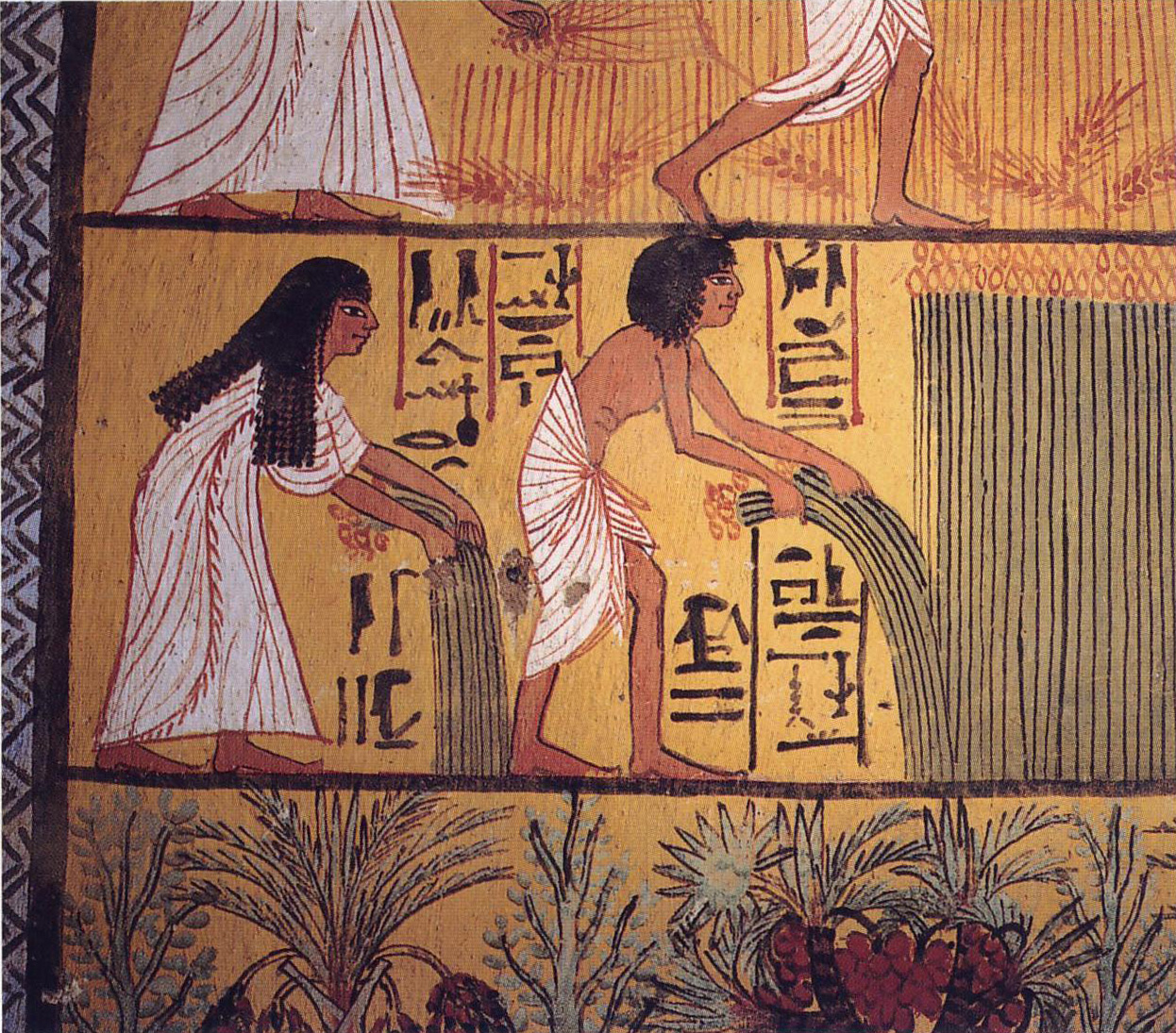
An early Ramesside Period mural painting from Deir el-Medina tomb depicts an Egyptian couple harvesting crops.

The cuisine of ancient Egypt encompasses the food and drink consumed by the ancient Egyptians throughout a span of over three thousand years, which retained many consistent traits until well into Greco-Roman times. The staples of the ancient Egyptian diet were bread and beer, which were supplemented with vegetables, legumes, fruits, meat, and seasonings prepared in a multitude of ways.

== Meals ==
Depictions of banquets can be found in paintings from both the Old Kingdom and New Kingdom. They usually started sometime in the afternoon. Men and women were separated unless they were married. Seating varied according to social status, with those of the highest status sitting on chairs, those slightly lower on stools and those lowest in rank on the floor or standing. Before the food was served, basins were provided along with aromatics, and flower scented fat was burned to spread pleasant smells or to repel insects, depending on the type.

Lily flowers and flower collars were handed out and professional dancers (primarily women) entertained, accompanied by musicians playing harps, lutes, drums, tambourines, and clappers. There were usually considerable amounts of alcohol and abundant quantities of foods; there were whole roast oxen, ducks, geese, pigeons, and at times fish. The dishes frequently consisted of stews served with great amounts of bread, fresh vegetables and fruit. For sweets there were cakes baked with dates and sweetened with honey. The goddess Hathor was often invoked during feasts.

Food could be prepared by stewing, baking, boiling, grilling, frying, or roasting. Spices and herbs were added for flavor, though the former were expensive imports and therefore confined to the tables of the wealthy. Foods such as meats were mostly preserved by salting, and dates and raisins could be dried for long-term storage. The staples bread and beer were usually prepared in the same locations, as the yeast used for bread was also used for brewing. The two were prepared either in special bakeries or, more often, at home, and any surplus would be sold.

Honey was the primary sweetener, but was rather expensive. There was honey collected from the wild, and honey from domesticated bees kept in pottery hives. A cheaper alternative would have been dates or carob, with a hieroglyph (nedjem/bener) depicting a carob pod, that bore the primary meaning of "sweet; pleasant." Oils would be made from lettuce or radish seed, safflower, ben, balanites and sesame. Animal fat was employed for cooking and jars used for storing it have been found in many settlements.

== Bread ==
A depiction of the royal bakery from an engraving in the tomb of Ramesses III in the Valley of the Kings. There are many types of loaves, including ones that are shaped like animals. 20th dynasty.

Figurines of servants making bread, First Intermediate Period (after 2090 BC), from Gebelein- Museo Egizio, Turin.

Egyptian bread was made almost exclusively from emmer wheat, which was more difficult to turn into flour than most other varieties of wheat. The chaff does not come off through threshing, but comes in spikelets that needed to be removed by moistening and pounding with a pestle to avoid crushing the grains inside. It was then dried in the sun, winnowed and sieved and finally milled on a saddle quern, which functioned by moving the grindstone back and forth, rather than with a rotating motion.

The baking techniques varied over time. In the Old Kingdom, heavy pottery molds were filled with dough and then set in the embers to bake. During the Middle Kingdom tall cones were used on square hearths. In the New Kingdom a new type of a large open-topped clay oven, cylindrical in shape, was used, which was encased in thick mud bricks and mortar.

Dough was then slapped on the heated inner wall and peeled off when done, similar to how a tandoor oven is used for flatbreads. Tombs from the New Kingdom show images of bread in many different shapes and sizes. Loaves shaped like human figures, fish, various animals and fans, all of varying dough texture. Flavorings used for bread included coriander seeds and dates, but it is not known if this was ever used by the poor.

Other than emmer, barley was grown to make bread and also used for making beer, and so were lily seeds and roots, and tiger nut. The grit from the quern stones used to grind the flour mixed in with bread was a major source of tooth decay due to the wear it produced on the enamel. For those who could afford there was also fine dessert bread and cakes baked from high-grade flour.

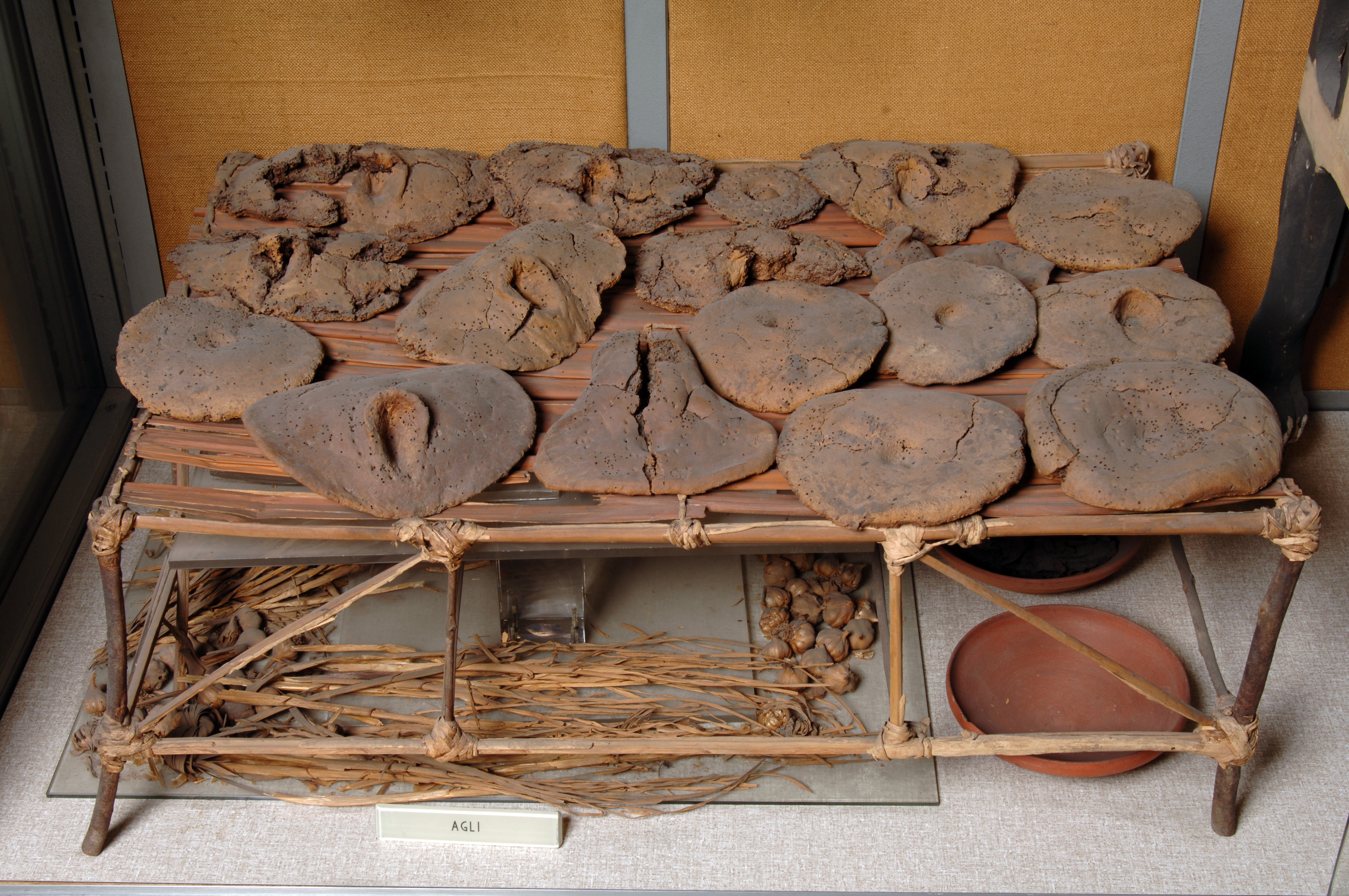
Small table of reeds and stems of papyrus, used to support bread loaves. New Kingdom, between 1425 and 1353 BC. AD, from the Tomb of Kha and Merit, Deir el-Medina. Museo Egizio, Turin.

== Beer ==
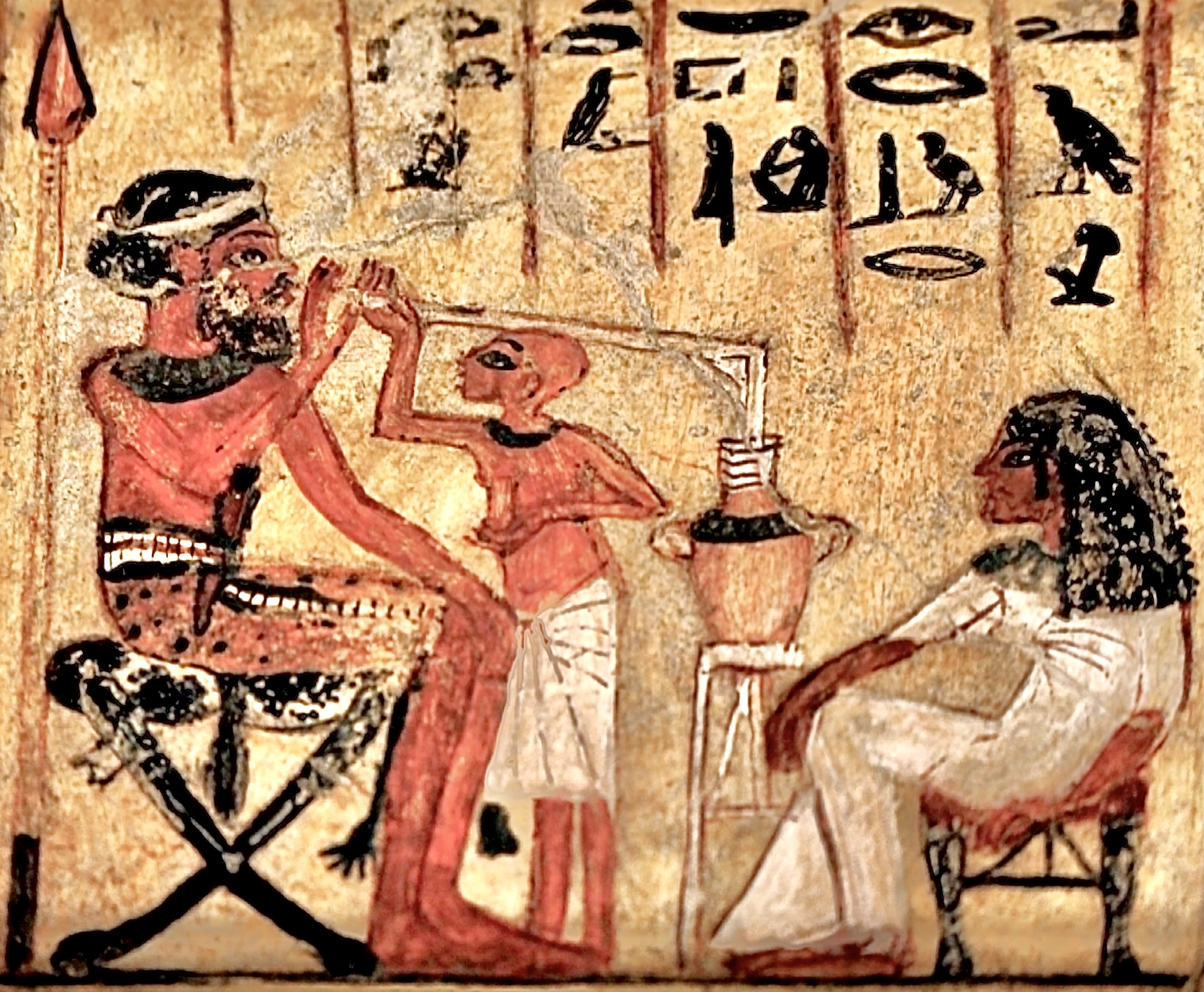
Detail of painted limestone stela, 18th dynasty, reign of Akhenaten (Amenophis IV), circa 1300 B.C.E. depicting use of an early form of drinking straw in beer-drinking. Egyptian Museum of Berlin

In Egypt beer was a primary source of nutrition, and consumed daily. Beer was such an important part of the Egyptian diet that it was even used as currency. Like most modern African beers, but unlike European beer, it was very cloudy with plenty of solids and highly nutritious, quite reminiscent of gruel. It was an important source of protein, minerals and vitamins and was so valuable that beer jars were often used as a measurement of value and were used in medicine. Little is known about specific types of beer, but there is mention of, for example, sweet beer but without any specific details mentioned.

Globular-based vessels with a narrow neck that were used to store fermented beer from pre-dynastic times have been found at Hierakonpolis and Abydos with emmer wheat residue that shows signs of gentle heating from below. Though not conclusive evidence of early beer brewing, it is an indication that this might have been what they were used for.

Archeological evidence shows that beer was made by first baking "beer bread", a type of well-leavened bread, lightly baked so as to avoid killing the yeasts, which was then crumbled over a sieve, washed with water in a vat and finally left to ferment. Such "beer bread" resembles closely the type used in the preparation of bouza, a traditional, home-brewed beer still consumed in Egypt today.

Microscopy of beer residue points to a different method of brewing where bread was not used as an ingredient. One batch of grain was sprouted, which produced enzymes. The next batch was cooked in water, dispersing the starch and then the two batches were mixed. The enzymes began to consume the starch to produce sugar. The resulting mixture was then sieved to remove chaff, and yeast (and probably lactic acid) was then added to begin a fermentation process that produced alcohol. This method of brewing is still used in parts of non-industrialized Africa. Most beers were made of barley and only a few of emmer wheat, but so far no evidence of flavoring has been found.

== Fruit, vegetables, and legumes ==
Vegetables and legumes were the main source of calories and nutrients after bread and beer, and added variety to the diets of both common and wealthy Egyptians. The most common vegetables were long-shooted green scallions or onions and garlic. Lettuce, cucumbers, leeks, and possibly chate melons and certain types of Old World gourds were eaten. Evidence is not conclusive on if radishes, turnips, and cabbage were available prior to the Greco-Roman period, nor is it certain if celery, introduced by the late New Kingdom, was used as food. The tubers, stems, and seeds of sedges, including papyrus, lotus, and chufa were eaten raw, boiled, roasted, or ground into flour. A dessert was made from ground tiger nuts, the tuber of the chufa plant, mixed with honey. Legumes included peas, beans, lentils, chickpeas, lobia, and lupins.

The most common fruit were dates and there were also figs, grapes (and raisins), dom palm nuts (eaten raw or steeped to make juice), certain species of Mimusops, and nabk berries (jujube or other members of the genus Ziziphus). Figs were so common because they were high in sugar and protein. The dates would either be dried/dehydrated or eaten fresh. Dates were sometimes even used to ferment wine and the poor would use them as sweeteners. Unlike vegetables, which were grown year-round, fruit was more seasonal. Pomegranates and grapes would be brought into tombs of the deceased.

== Meat, fowl and fish ==
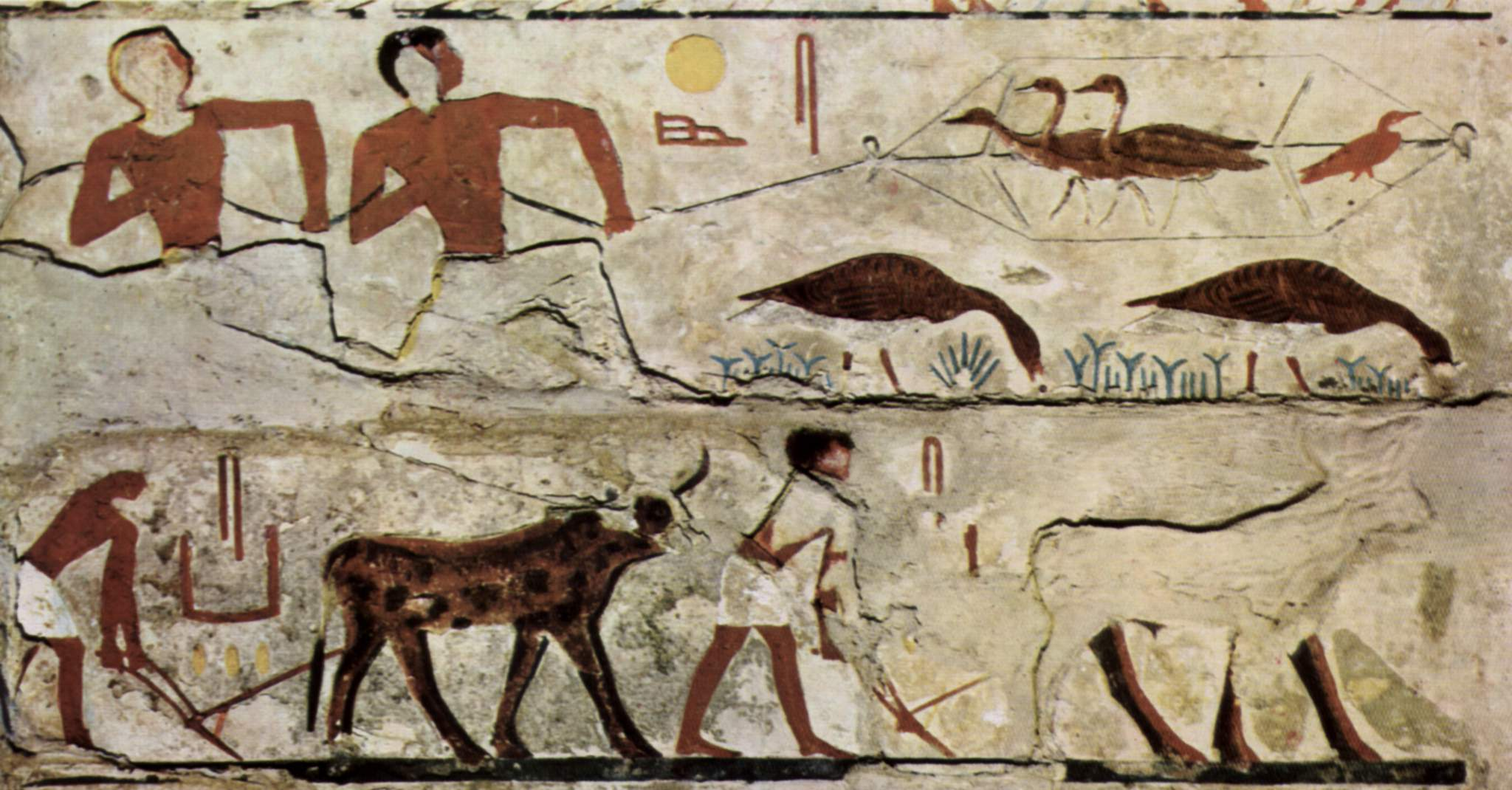
Hunting game birds and plowing a field. Depiction on a burial chamber from c. 2700 BC. Tomb of Nefermaat and his wife Itet.

Meat came from domesticated animals, game and poultry. This possibly included partridge, quail, pigeon, ducks and geese. The chicken most likely arrived around the 5th to 4th century BC, though no chicken bones have actually been found dating from before the Greco-Roman period. The most important animals were cattle, sheep, goats and pigs (previously thought to have been taboo to eat because the priests of Egypt referred pig to the evil god Seth).

5th-century BC Greek historian Herodotus claimed that the Egyptians abstained from consuming female cows as they were sacred by association with Isis. They sacrificed male oxen that were inspected to be clean and free of disease and ate the remainder after it was ritually burned. Ill or diseased male oxen that were not worthy of sacrifice and had died were buried ritually, and then dug up after the bones were clean and placed in a temple. Only the heads of the male oxen that were cut off and then cursed were available to be eaten by the Greeks in Egypt, as they were not allowed the sacred sacrifice meat. Excavations at the Giza workers' village have uncovered evidence of massive slaughter of oxen, sheep and pigs, such that researchers estimate that the workforce building the Great Pyramid were fed beef every day.

Mutton and pork were more common, despite Herodotus' affirmations that swine were held by the Egyptians to be unclean and avoided. Poultry, both wild and domestic, and fish were available to all but the most destitute. The alternative protein sources would rather have been legumes, eggs, cheese and the amino acids available in the tandem staples of bread and beer. Mice and hedgehogs were also eaten; a common way to cook hedgehog was to encase it in clay and bake it. When the clay was then cracked open and removed, it took the prickly spikes with it.

Foie gras, a delicacy which is still consumed, was invented by the ancient Egyptians. The technique of gavage, force-feeding domesticated ducks and geese, dates as far back as 2500 BC, when the Egyptians began keeping birds for food.

A 14th century book translated and published in 2017 lists 10 recipes for sparrow which was eaten for its aphrodisiac properties.

== Reflection in Modern Egyptian cuisine ==
Much of modern Egyptian cuisine originated in ancient times and remains to this day a staple of Egyptian cuisine, most notably: Sun bread, Fesikh, Fol medemes, Kahk, Molokhia, Bosara, beer, Doum palm, Feteer meshaltet, Rumi cheese and spring onions.

== See also ==
- Egyptian cuisine
- Hunting, fishing and animals in ancient Egypt
- Shedeh
- List of ancient dishes
