= Kolkas =

Egyptian stew made with taro root

Qolqas قلقاس
- Place of origin: Egypt
- Main ingredients: Taro root, beef, onion, garlic, cilantro

Qolqas (Arabic: قلقاس 'ul'as), also transliterated as kolkas in English, is a stew eaten in Egypt featuring taro root cooked in a broth infused with garlic and cilantro. This hearty stew is particularly popular during the winter months and holds cultural significance, especially among Coptic Christians during the Epiphany feast.

== Preparation ==
The preparation of qolqas begins with peeling and dicing the taro root into cubes. Raw taro contains calcium oxalate, which can cause skin irritation when handled without gloves. The diced taro is soaked in water, often overnight, to reduce its sliminess. Alternatively, some recipes suggest boiling the taro root until tender before adding it to the stew.

In a separate process, a flavorful broth is prepared using ingredients such as ghee, cinnamon, bay leaves, mastic resin, cardamom, peppercorns, allspice, garlic, onions, and beef. The meat and spices are sautéed until the meat develops a golden crust, then boiling water is added, and the mixture is simmered until the meat becomes tender. The broth is then strained to remove the spices and vegetables, leaving a clear, aromatic liquid. Alternatively, vegetable broth can be used for a vegetarian version of the dish.

The diced taro is added to the simmering broth along with a squeeze of lemon or lime juice to prevent discoloration. The taro is cooked until fork-tender. Meanwhile, the greens are blended with a small amount of broth to create an extract, which is then strained and added to the simmering broth, imparting a vibrant color and fresh flavor. In some variations, the greens are sautéed with garlic before being added to the stew.

A key component of qolqas is the 'taqlia', a mixture of minced garlic and ground coriander sautéed in ghee until golden and aromatic, commonly used in Egyptian cooking. This mixture is added to the stew, enhancing its depth of flavor. The stew is then simmered briefly to allow the flavors to meld before serving. Some recipes also suggest adding sautéed garlic and cilantro directly to the stew for added flavor.

Qolqas is traditionally served over rice or with eish baladi.

== See also ==
- Egyptian cuisine
- List of Middle Eastern dishes
- List of African dishes
