= Ful nabet =

Egyptian soup made from sprouted fava beans

Ful nabet فول نابت
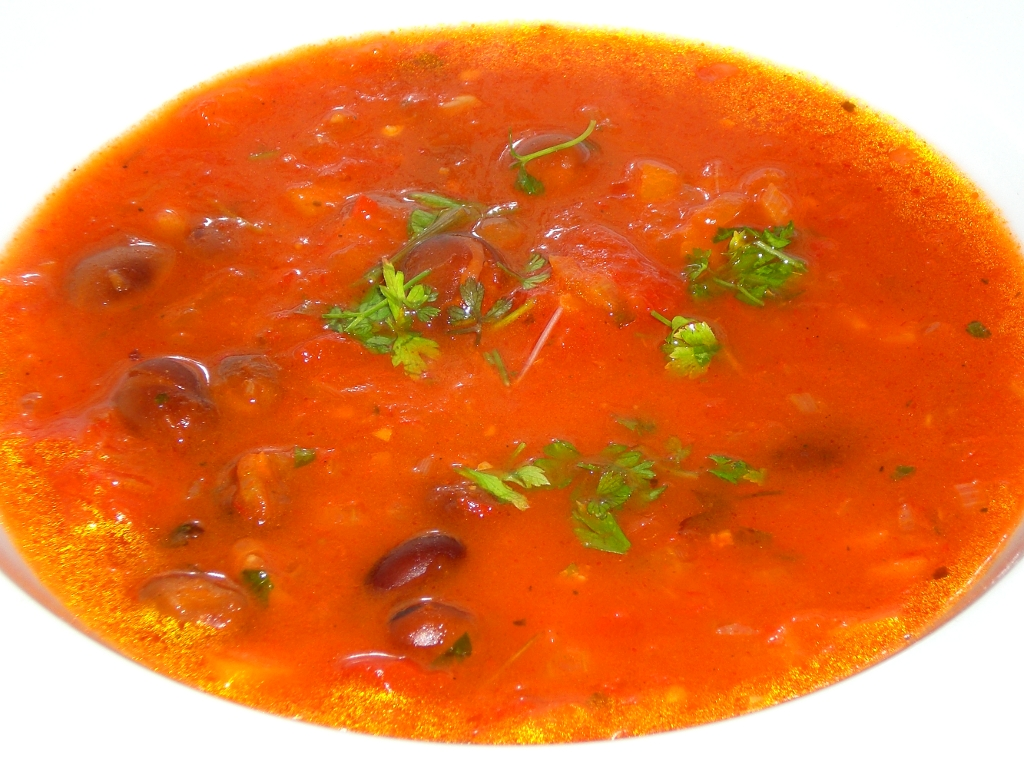
- Type: Soup
- Place of origin: Egypt
- Serving temperature: Hot
- Main ingredients: Fava beans, onion, cumin, olive oil

Ful nabet (Arabic: فول نابت) is an Egyptian soup made from sprouted fava beans. The soup is particularly popular during the colder months and is often prepared for sick people.

== Preparation ==
The preparation begins by soaking dried fava beans in water for 8 to 12 hours, with periodic water changes to prevent bacterial growth, until they sprout, a process that takes approximately two days. Once sprouted, the beans are boiled in water with onions and cumin until tender. The soup is then seasoned with salt, black pepper, and a squeeze of lemon juice to enhance the flavor. Carrots and other vegetables may be added to the soup, according to preference. This nutritious and hearty soup is often accompanied by eish baladi, which is used for dipping.

For a richer taste, some variations include using chicken broth or beef broth instead of water.

== Nutrition ==
The sprouting process enhances the fava beans' nutrient profile, making them a rich source of antioxidants, protein, dietary fiber, vitamins, and minerals. This has given ful nabet a reputation in Egypt as a particularly nourishing dish, often prepared for those who are sick.

== See also ==
- Egyptian cuisine
- List of Middle Eastern dishes
- List of African dishes
