= Okra leaf =

Okra leaf may refer to:

- Leaf of okra
- Melokhiya, which thickens like okra
