= Eish shamsi =

Egyptian sourdough bread

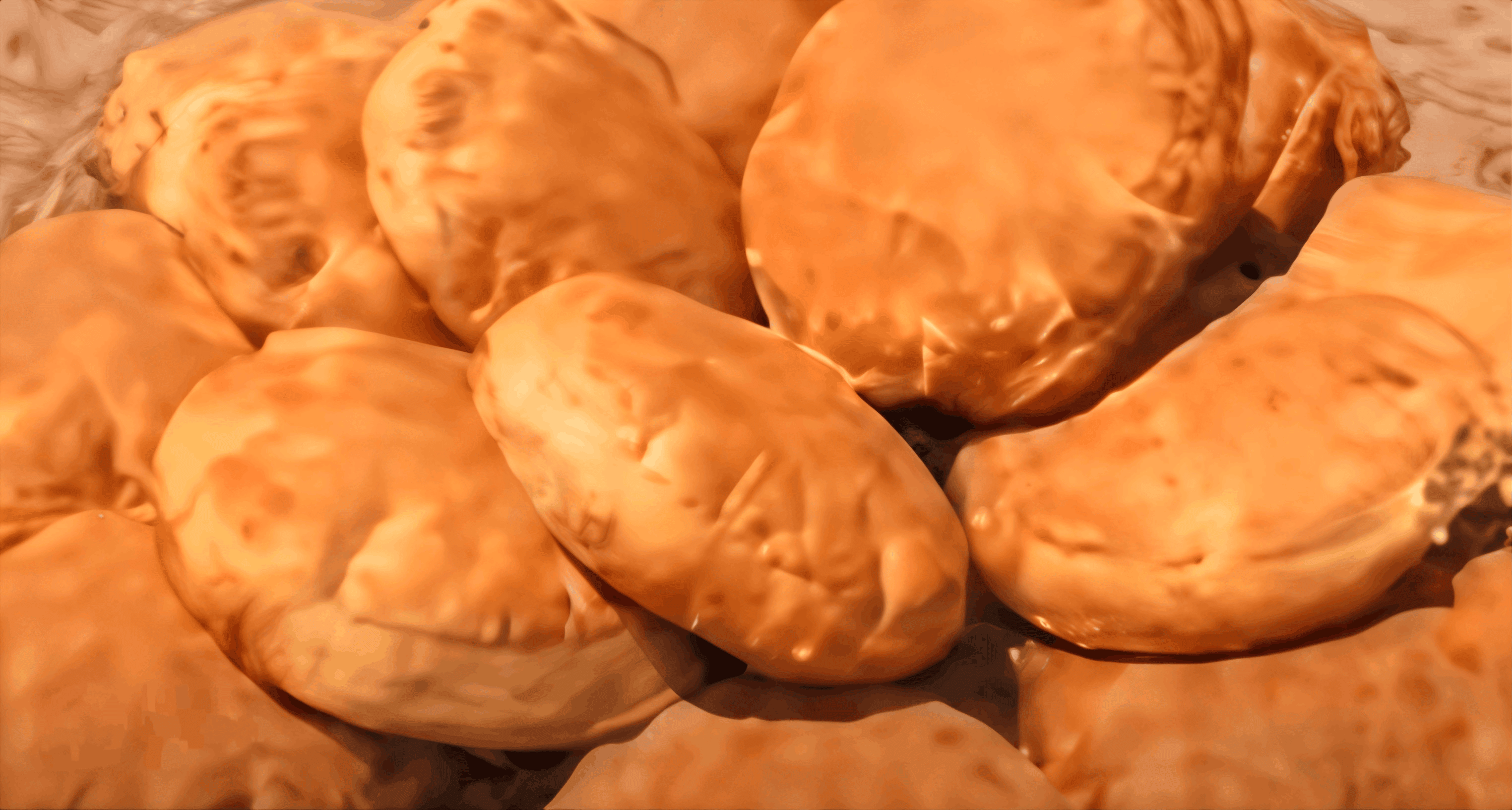
- Type: Sourdough
- Place of origin: Egypt
- Region or state: Upper Egypt
- Main ingredients: Wheat, Yeast

Eish shamsi (Egyptian Arabic: عيش شمسي), is a thick sourdough bread eaten in Egypt made with wheat flour. In Upper Egypt it replaces eish baladi as the local staple, although the latter is common as well. The name, which translates to "sun bread", is thought to derive from the practice of letting the dough rise in the sun. The bread is traditionally baked at home in domed clay ovens with openings at the top, although this tradition is fading with pre-made bread becoming increasingly common.

== History ==
Sun Bread originated in Ancient Egypt, it was found depicted in multiple tomb art and remains of such bread was found in tombs.

== Shape ==
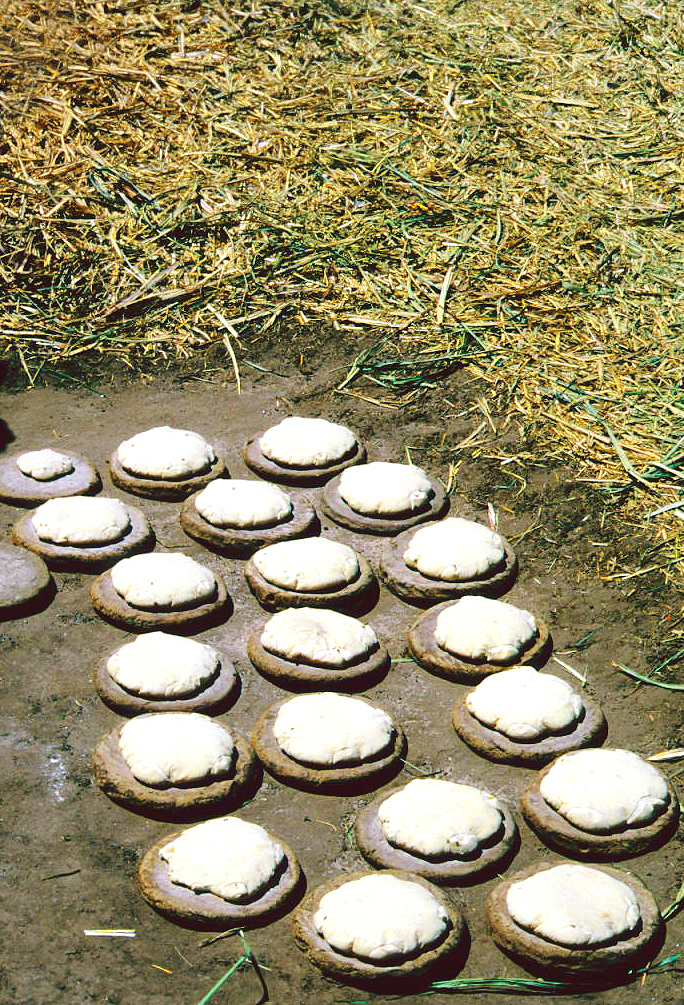
Shamsi bread being prepared in Luxor

The shape of the bread is determined by the pattern of the scoring, which is done with a needle. The common way to do it is making slits all around the top-edge for a round bread. Another common way to do it is making crescent-shaped slits in the dough which results in a triangle-shaped bread. Christians tend to score the dough in a way that achieves a rough cross-shape. These bread shapes resemble those on depictions of bread offerings on tomb paintings dating back to ancient Egypt. Although it is uncommon in Lower Egypt, some bakeries in Cairo make it especially for their Upper Egyptian clientele.

== See also ==
- Egyptian cuisine
- Eish baladi
- Sourdough
