= Shedeh =

Ancient Egyptian beverage

Shedeh in hieroglyphs
F30 D46 V28 G43 W24 Z2
šdḥ

Shedeh was a drink of ancient Egypt. Although it was long thought to have been made from pomegranates, recent evidence suggests it came from red grapes.

Our results definitively reveal that the ancient Egyptian highly valued Shedeh drink was a grape product, specifically made from red grapes.

== History ==
The name Shedeh appeared inscribed on the labels of two-handled Egyptian pottery amphorae at the site of el-Amarna and belonging to the reign of Akhenaten, late XVIII Dynasty. Its name showed it was a beverage different from traditional (grape)wine, whose Egyptian name was irep. An example of the importance of Shedeh in ancient Egyptian times was that it was cited in Egyptian romantic poetry, where Shedeh was associated with a lover’s voice. During the Ramesside (1292–1075 BC) and Ptolemaic (305–30 BC) periods, the Shedeh drink was recorded on temple inscriptions and used as a religious offering as well as for embalming.

== Discovery ==
In 2006, a team of Spanish scientists led by Maria Rosa Guasch-Jané developed a new method of identifying an acid left by compounds in red wine. The evidence was compiled using both liquid chromatography and mass spectrometry together, which revealed syringic acid in scrapings taken from jars in Tutankhamun's tomb. Syringic acid is released by the breakdown of the compound malvidin, found in red wine.

== See also ==
- History of wine
- Ancient Egyptian cuisine
