= Hunting, fishing and animals in ancient Egypt =

Egyptian wildlife history

The ancient Egyptian culture is full of rich traditions and practices revolving around human interactions with wildlife. Wildlife in ancient Egypt used to be very different compared to the wildlife currently present in Egypt for several factors and variables. Animals such as elephants, rhinoceros, and hippopotami used to live in different parts of Egypt, however these animals do not exist in Egypt today. Animals were very much appreciated and important in Egyptian history; even some deities were represented as animals; as Hathor the goddess of fertility, love and beauty was represented as a cow.

== Animals and religion ==
In ancient Egypt, there existed a ceremony for slaughtering animals. However, there is no one common ritual, but several different ceremonies the most important ceremony is represented in the Ra temple, the dramatically texts of Ramesseum and in the Book of Opening The Mouth. The pictures often display the same scene, where a bull is lying on the ground, with its legs tethered together; on the other side of the bull, is a woman; with the butcher ready to cut off its forelegs, a sem priest standing behind the butcher and a lector priest. The woman is identified as a goddess, Isis; the sem priest gives the signal for the butcher to slaughter the bull and the lector priest reciting the ritual.

== Swamp hunting ==
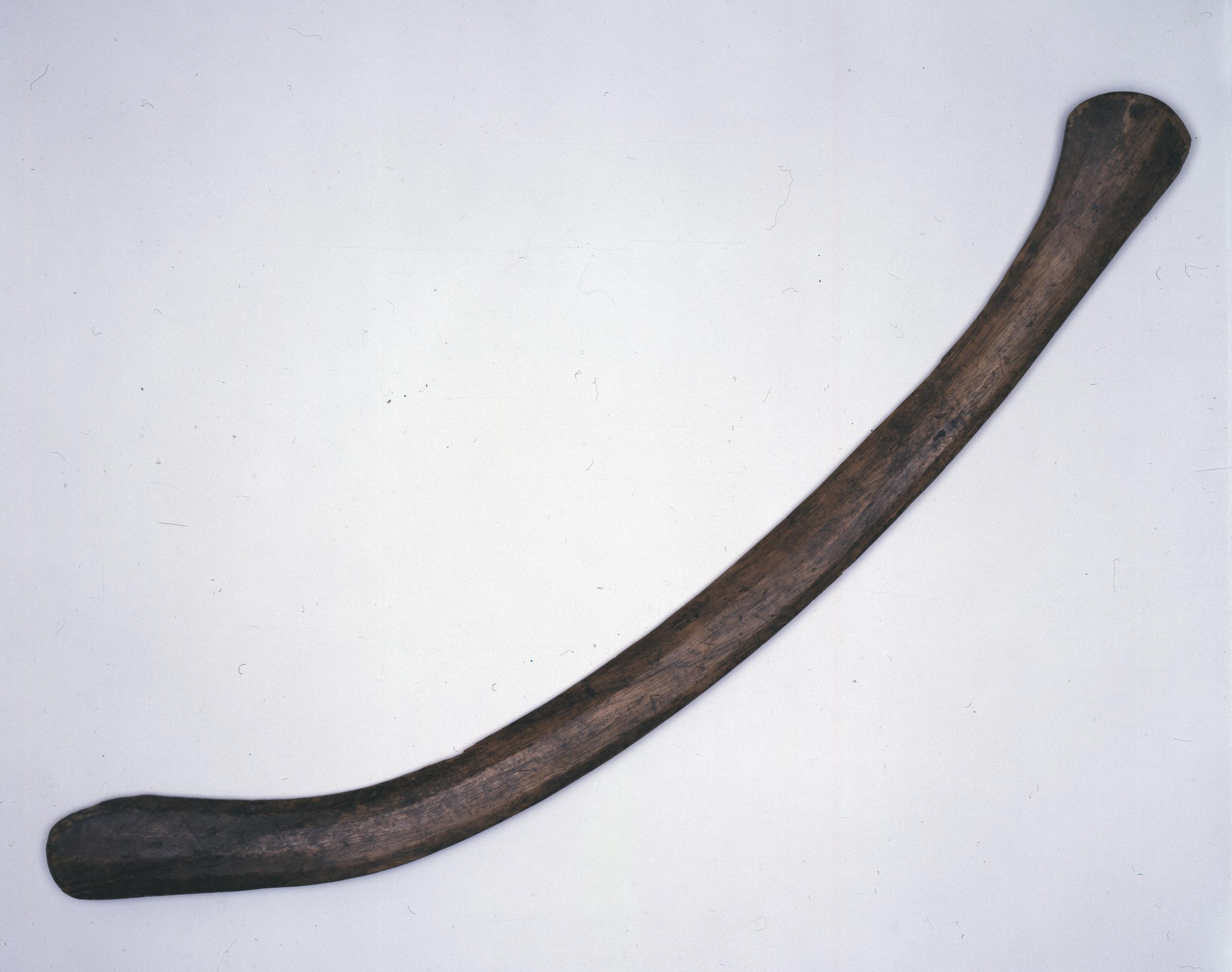
A throwing stick used in water fowl hunting at the British Museum.

Swamp hunting was a social event in which upper class hunting society families practiced. Swamp hunting included fowling with sticks and spear fishing. According to the narratives of the poorly preserved The Pleasures of Fishing and Fowling and The Sporting King which were edited by Ricardo Caminos. These narratives described how the upper class enjoyed hunting as recreational sport. The Pleasures of Fishing and Fowling narrates King Amenemhat II's swamp hunts, where the royal hunting party travels to a lake in Faiyum. The group included women of the harem and the king's children.

=== Fowling with sticks ===
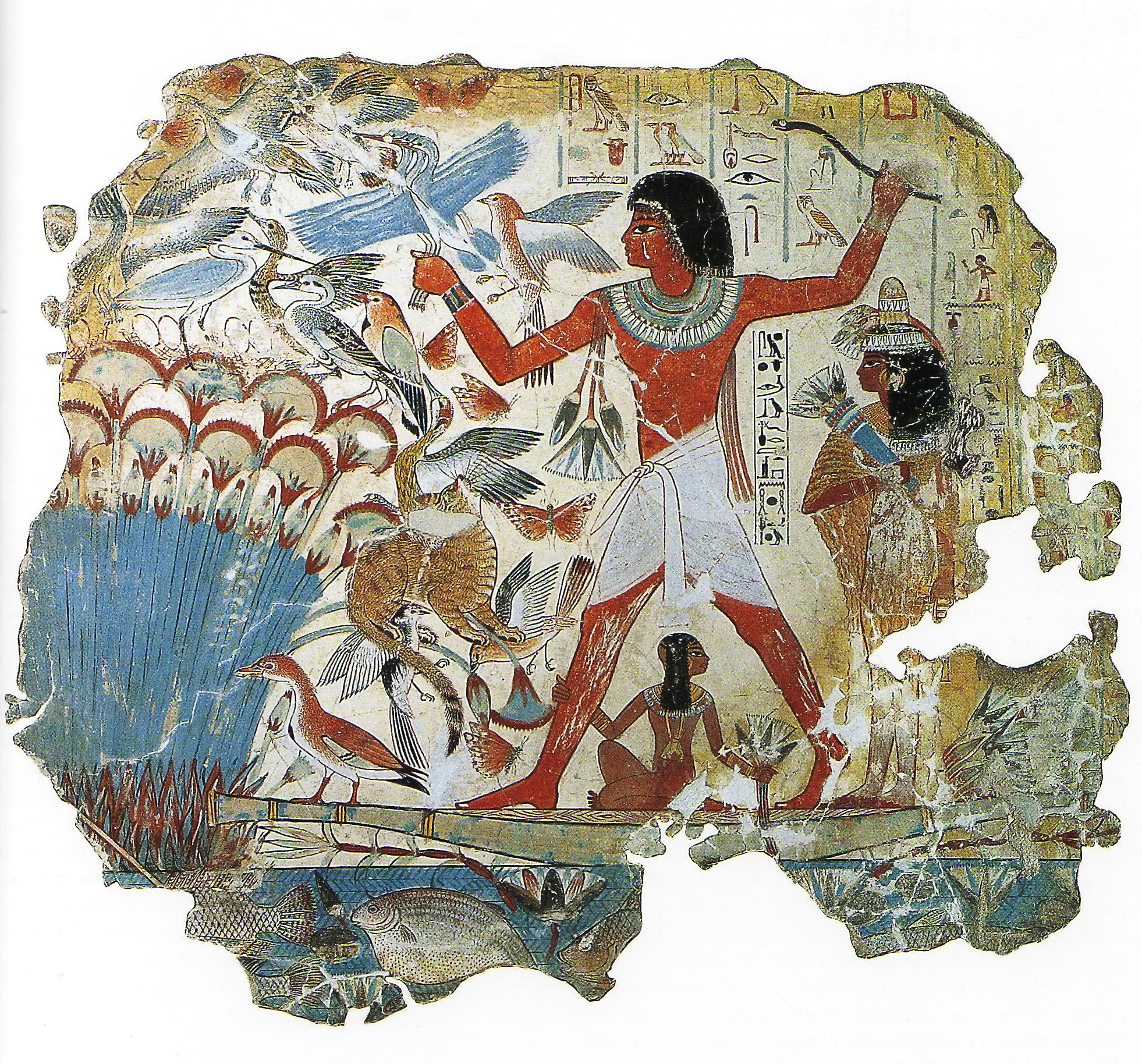
Hunting scene from Tomb of Nebamun

Egypt's geographic location played a major role in the variety and population of birds in Egypt. Migrating Eurasian birds exhausted from their long journey come to rest in the wetlands of the Nile delta. Ancient Egyptians capitalized from the large flocks of birds and hunted them either for food, offerings to the dead and gods. Bird hunting through fowling with sticks was considered to be a sport practiced by royalty in ancient Egypt. Fowling with sticks was practiced by throwing a stick at flying birds. Initially, fowling with sticks was considered as a hobby practiced by the elite, fowling with sticks became a common practice to commoners and not specific to royalty after the 5th Dynasty.

=== Clap net bird fowling ===
A more efficient and effective technique practiced by ancient Egyptians to fowl birds was clap net, however it required teamwork, skilled fowlers, someone to coordinate and oversee, a clap net and sometimes a decoy bird which was usually a grey heron to attract the prey.

== Fishing ==
Fish were very abundant in Egypt, as Egypt is located on both the Mediterranean and Red Seas, along with the river Nile. Fishing was typically practiced on the river Nile, either by nets from a boat, using dragnets from shore or using bow nets in narrow banks of the river. On the other hand, fishing was also practiced as a sport for pleasure. Spearfishing and angling were two types of fishing as a sport that required a lot of patience and skill.

=== Spear fishing ===
A demanding and challenging method of fishing, spearfishing requires certain attributes in the hunter, as patience to decoy the fish and a certain amount of accuracy to end up with a well-aimed throw. Spearfishing in ancient Egypt had greater value as a sport than angling did. Originally, in prehistoric and early times, spearfishing only served to provide food, and then it evolved into a recreation for the upper class.

==== Fishing spears and their construction ====
According to archeological evidence, spears used in sports could be divided into three types; spears with a single head, two headed spears and harpoons. It is not clear whether harpoons were used to fish for fish only or for crocodiles and hippopotami also; this is because of the relative small size of the harpoon to the size of the hippopotami and crocodiles.

=== Angling ===
Similar to modern fishing, angle fishing was a very common fishing technique, which requires a hook, however, no fishing rods were used at the time, instead, thick hand lines. Angling was mostly practiced among commoners and not upper-class Egyptians. Unlike spear fishing, angling was not practiced as a sport but it was an important means of obtaining food. The picture evidence available does not show upper-class people practicing angling. However, usually the pictures display commoners using angling to fish from a boat, with their masters watching. Evidence of the first fishing rod appears in the Middle Kingdom period, in the tomb of Beni Hasan. Later on in tombs of 18th and 19th-dynasty officials, do we see evidence of upper-class Egyptians practicing fishing by angling with their wives, which indicates that by that time, fishing by angling had become an upper-class recreational sport.

== Hunting ==
Hunting was practiced as a way to gather food and for self-defense against wild animals in ancient Egypt. Once people started domesticating animals and depending on the breeding of animals for food hunting lost its importance as a source of nutrition. As a result of this lesser dependency on hunting for food hunting became a recreational sport. Hunting was practiced by royalty to signify power and the ability to protect their people from danger.

=== Hippopotamus ===
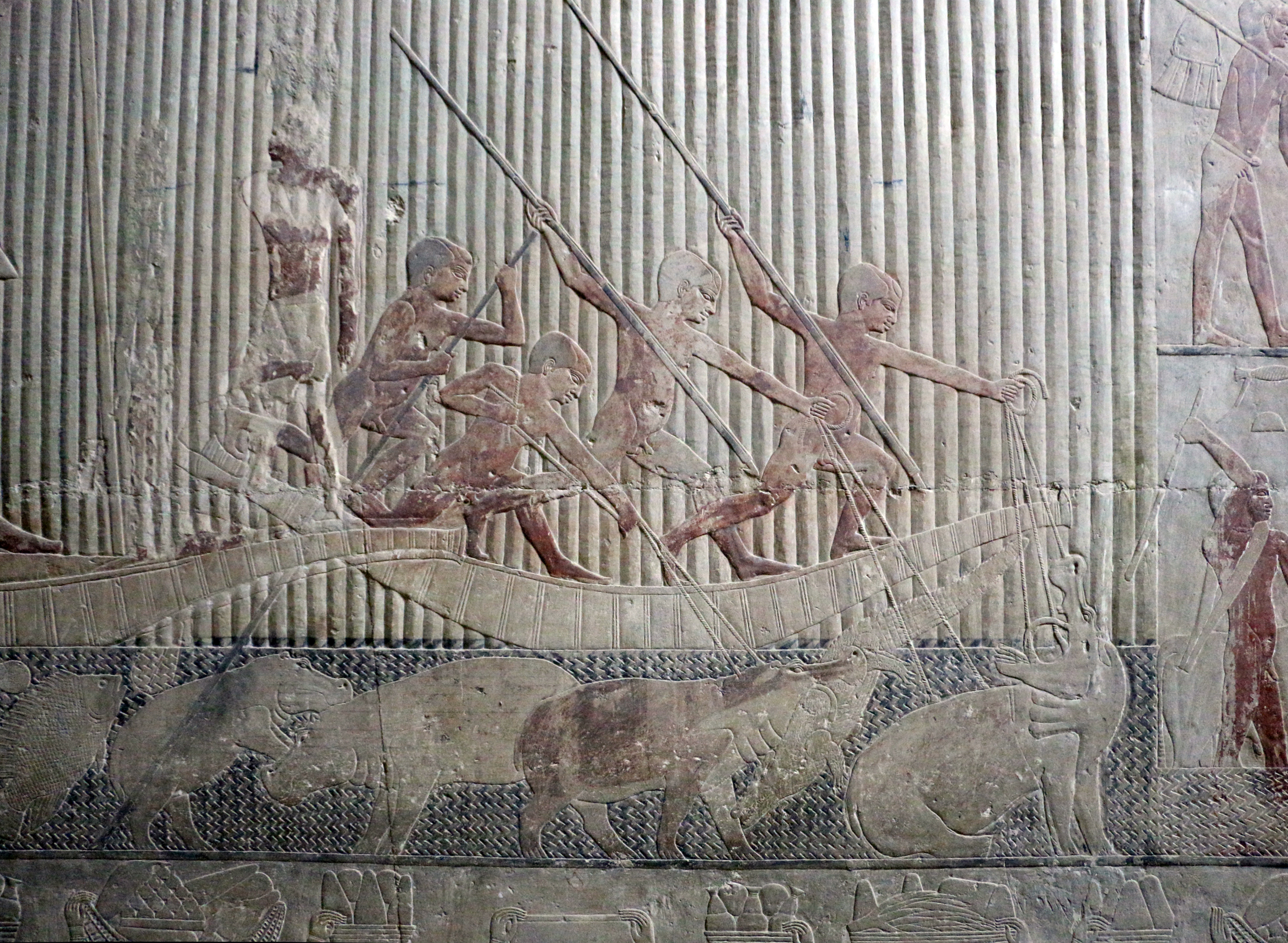
Hippopotami hunting scene from the Mastaba of Ti, 5th Dynasty

The hippopotamus often signifies chaos and evil in ancient Egypt, as the hippopotamus was believed to be the incarnation of the god Seth: the opponent of the good gods Osiris and Horus. Horus then avenged his father Osiris by killing Seth, who is incarnated as a hippopotamus. The king then takes the role of Horus whenever he kills the hippopotamus. From the 1st Dynasty onward, some pictures have been found with scenes in which the king hunts alone, as the hippopotamus became the symbol of chaos and evil. Hunting the hippopotamus displayed the king's unmatched power, as depicted in King Den's cylindrical seal, where he wrestles and pins down the hippopotamus weaponless. Other pictures have been found of tomb owners in the New Kingdom killing the hippopotamus, these pictures are believed to have an exclusive religious significance. The hippopotamus was also a symbol of the protective goddess Taweret.

=== Wild bulls ===
Wild bulls were usually hunted by kings, this is evident in the story of king Amenhotep III; where a man informed the king that there were wild bulls in the desert in the area of Faiyum. The king then traveled north to Faiyum accompanied by his army and ordered the soldiers to observe the wild bulls and confine them with fences and ditches. King Amenhotep III spent four days in the hunt without resting his horses and had a tally of ninety-six wild bulls out of a total of one hundred and seventy bulls observed. Moreover, drawings of bull hunting have been represented on the walls of Ramesses II's funerary temple in Medinet Habu, where he stabs the last breath out of an injured bull.

=== Lions ===
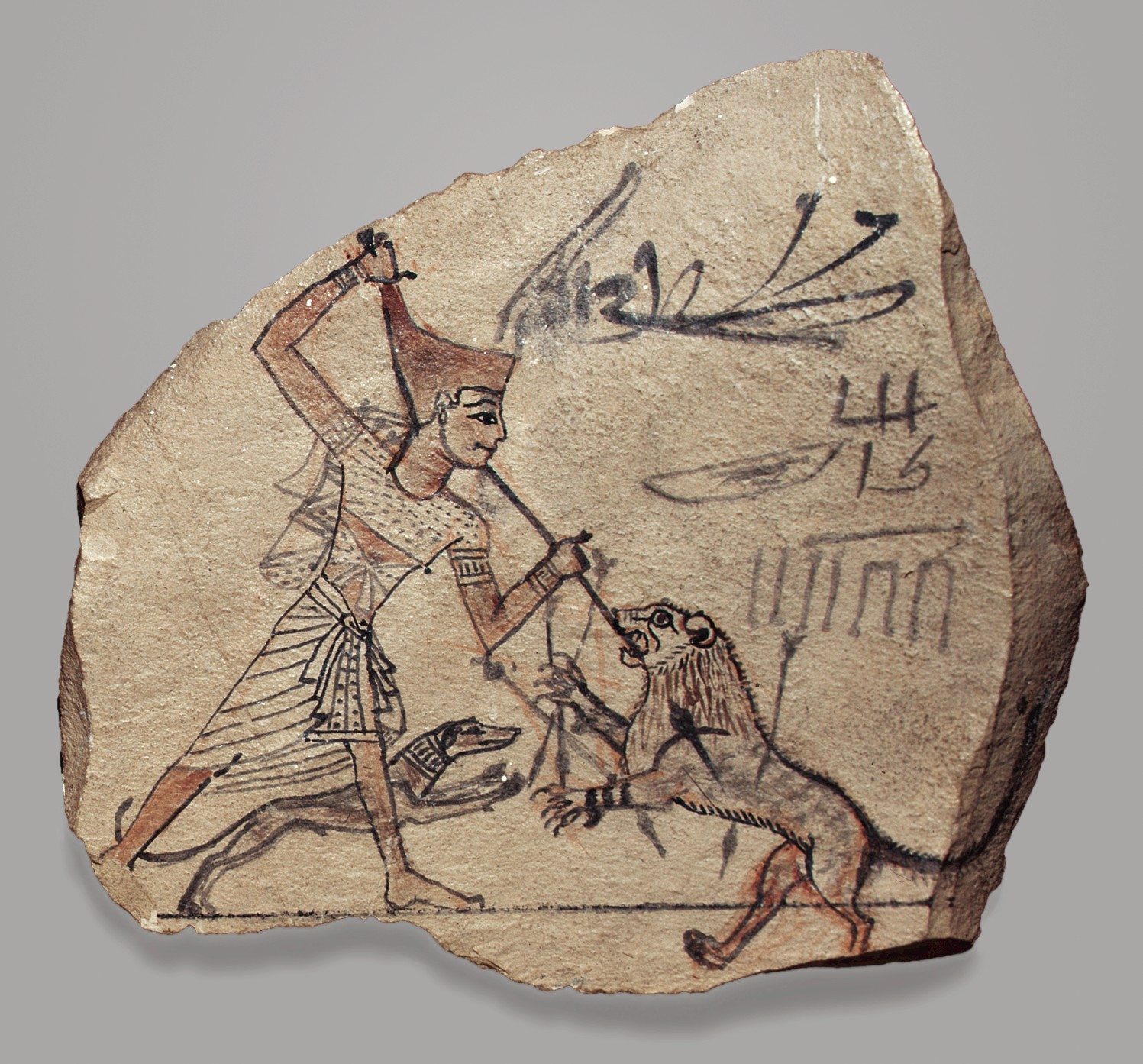
Sketch of pharaoh spearing a lion on an ostracon, 20th Dynasty

Lions are often identified as a symbol of power in the animal kingdom. The earliest pictures of lion hunting came from late prehistoric or early historic times and in the beginning it was not intended to be as a sport, but to rid the country of a plague, which was threatening people. Later, pictures emerged of the king taking hold of the lion to stab it to death as was displayed in Ramesses III's temple at Medinet Habu. Moreover, Thutmose III bragged about his ability to hunt lions, claiming that he killed seven lions in one second with his arrow shot. Amenhotep III, a fan of big game hunting, had a list of the animals he hunted, including one hundred and two wild lions in his first decade as ruler.

=== Elephants ===
In prehistoric times, elephants were despised and initially driven out by Egyptians because of their consumption of the crops and damaging the agriculture. It is not until the Egyptians push into Asia in the 18th Dynasty that the Egyptian came into contact with elephants. Hunting elephants was treasured by Egyptian kings because of their ivory which was valuable, moreover, hunting elephants showed the power of the king because of the elephants immense size. Thutmose III reported that he killed 120 elephants.
