= Fowling =

Hunting of birds

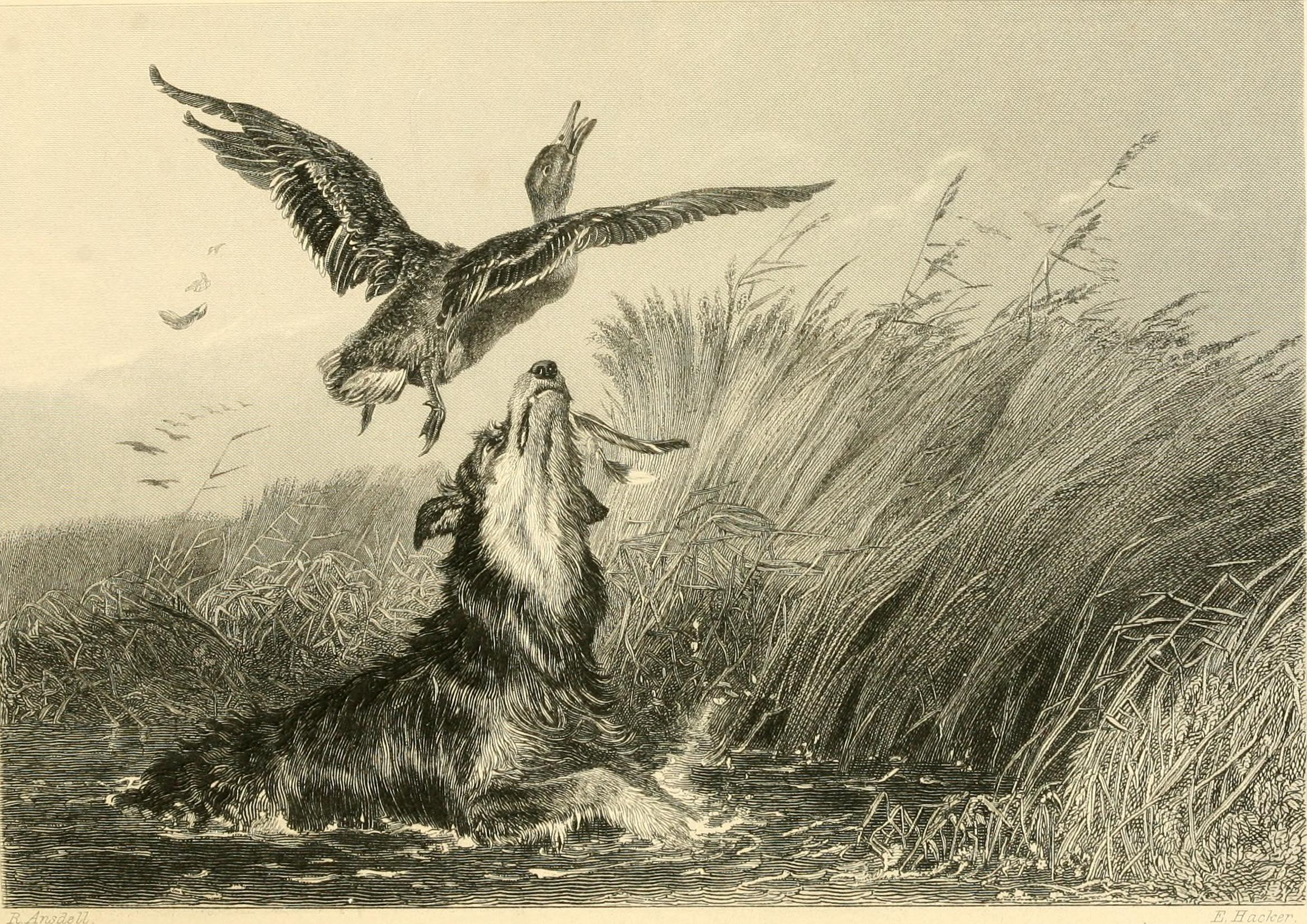
Illustration of a hunting dog retrieving a shot duck

Fowling (/ˈfaʊlɪŋ/) is the hunting of birds by humans, for food (meat), feathers or any other commercially value products, or simply for leisure ("sporting") or collecting trophies. It is comparable to wildfowling, the practice of hunting waterfowls for food or sport. The term is perhaps better known in the Fens of Eastern England than elsewhere, but was certainly not confined to the Fens. The land margins of the north produced down feathers from eider duck for eiderdowns and quilted jackets without necessarily killing the birds. In the Western Isles of Scotland, seabirds were taken from their nests on cliffs. In The Fens and other similar places, a decoy was part of a landowner's well-equipped estate.

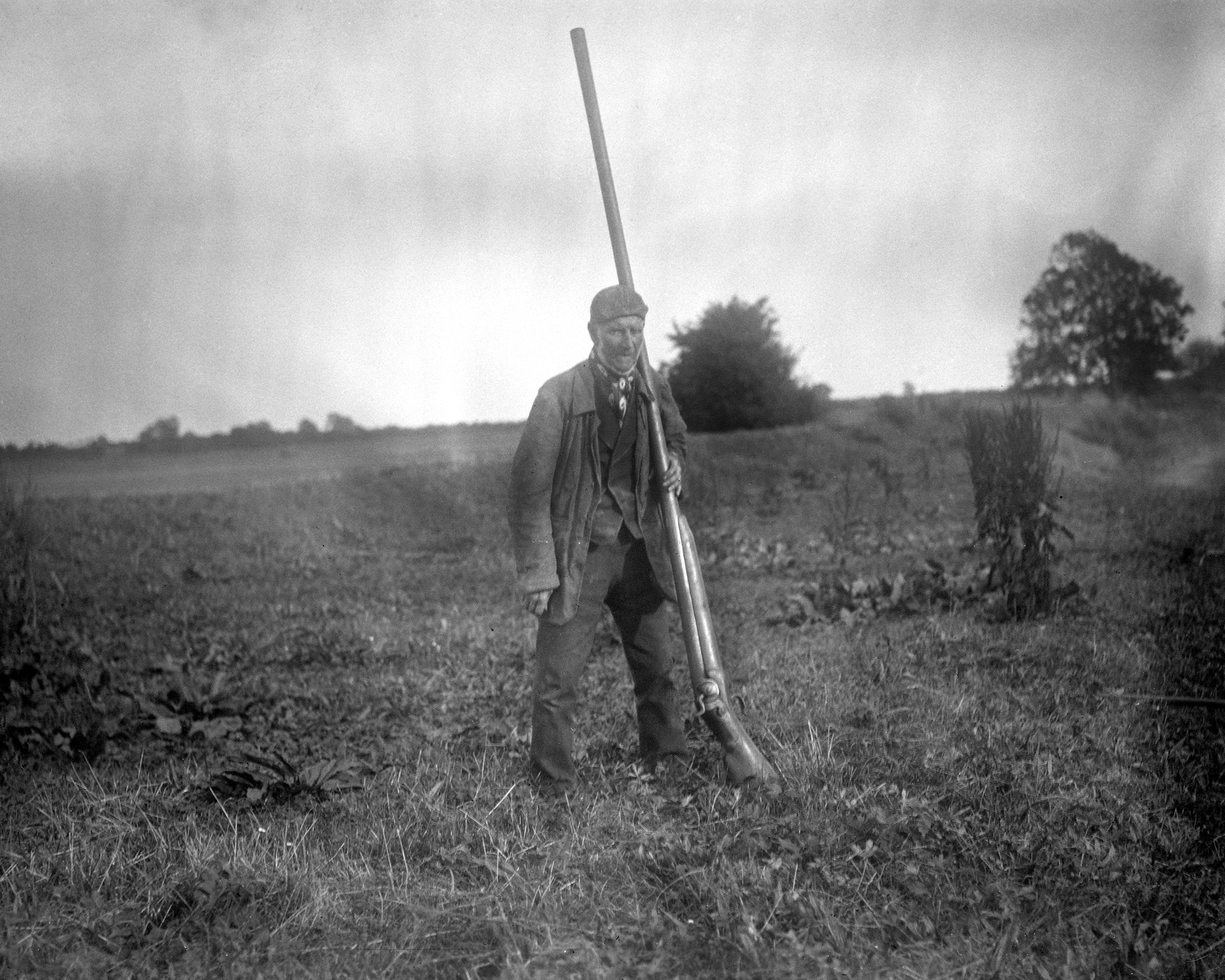
Fowler with a punt gun

The epitome of fowling was, however, the punt gunner. He had what amounted to a long, small-bore muzzle-loaded cannon. It was mounted along the centre-line of the forward half of a specially designed boat which slightly resembled a heavy wooden kayak in form. The fowler lay in the after half with paddle blades strapped to his forearms. The skill was to stalk a raft of duck until within the rather short range required and to fire the gun from which small shot scattered. It remained to gather up the harvest and get it to market. In the winter, the punt gun might be mounted on a sled and the procedure repeated on the same principles.

== See also ==
- Wildfowling
- Upland hunting
- Gun dog
- Snipe hunt
