= Carob (hieroglyph) =

Egyptian hieroglyph

M29
Carob-Pod
n(dj)m (nedjem)
in hieroglyphs

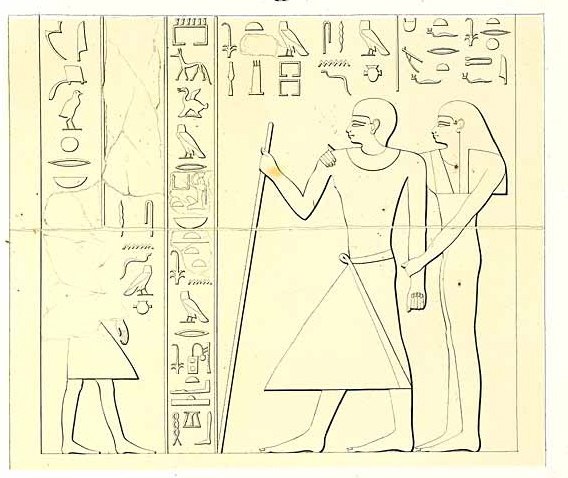
Temple relief: Senedjem and wife Tjefi.

The vertical carob M29 (Gardiner M29) and the vertical date M30 (Gardiner M30) have identical meanings in the Egyptian hieroglyphic language of "sweet", and related words. The carob (hieroglyph) is a ripe carob pod w/seeds, and its meaning of "sweet" extends to items of taste, smell, and touch.

In Budge's compendium dictionary, there are fifteen entries with nedjem, and related words. Six of them are a doubling of the word, nedjemnedjem related to passion, concubines, etc.

== See also ==
- Gardiner's Sign List#M. Trees and Plants
- List of Egyptian hieroglyphs
