= Mulukhiyah =

Jute-leaf dish from Egypt

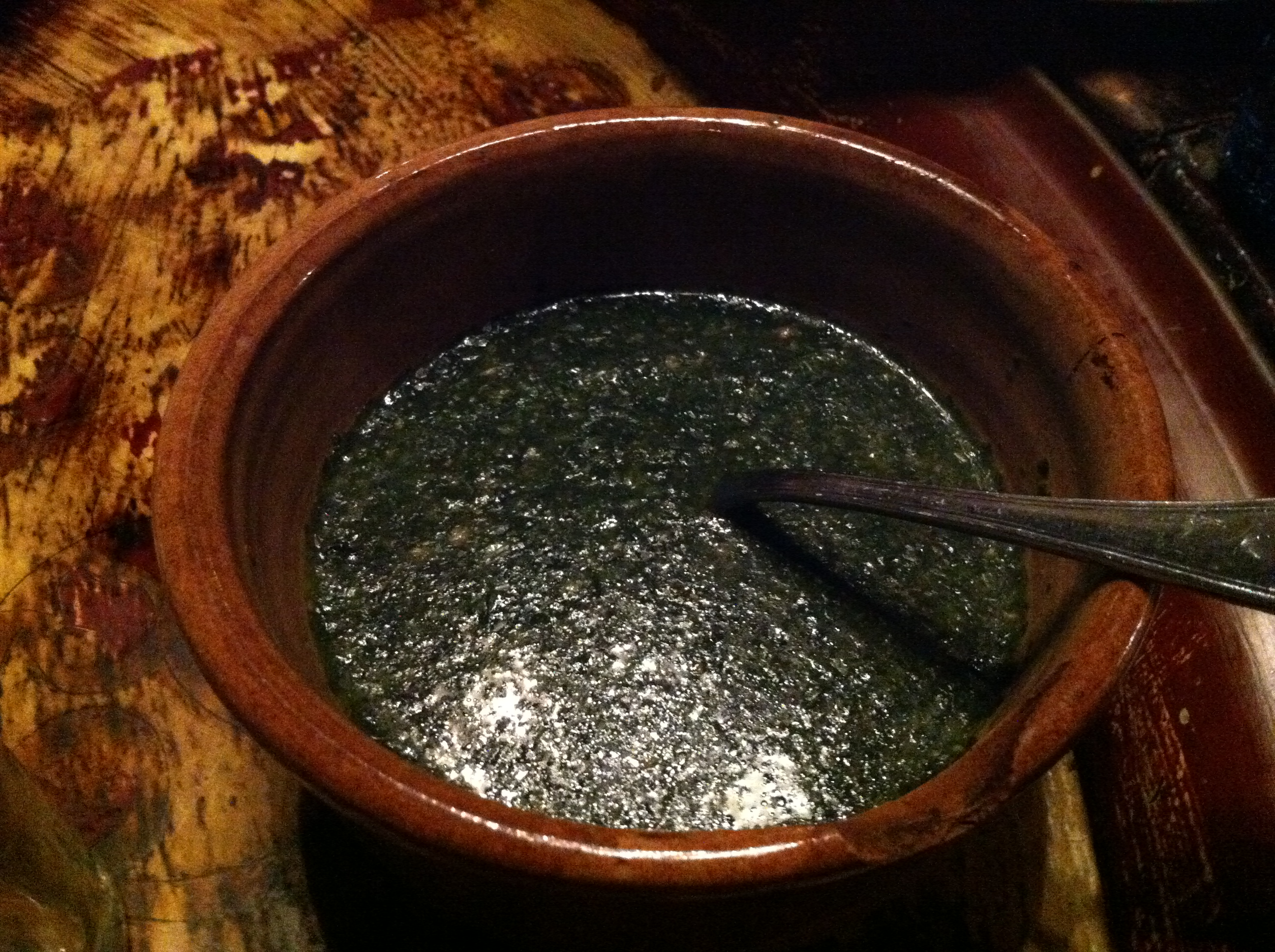
- Egyptian molokhiya
- Alternative names: Mulukhiyya, molokhiyyah, molokhiyya, melokhiyya, molohiya; ewédú; saluyot; lalo
- Type: Soup
- Course: Side dish
- Place of origin: Ancient Egypt
- Region or state: Arab world
- Associated cuisine: Arab cuisine; Nigerian cuisine
- Main ingredients: Jute; beef or chicken stock

Mulukhiyah (Arabic: مُلُوخِيَّة, romanized: mulūḫiyya), also known as mulukhiyya, molokhiyya, melokhiyya, molohiya or ewédú, is a type of jute plant whose leaves are used to prepare a traditional Egyptian and Arab dish. Originating in Egypt, the dish became popular across the Middle East and North Africa and the Levant, Arab cuisine and the medieval Arab culinary tradition.

It is made from the leaves of Corchorus olitorius, commonly known in English as jute, Jew's mallow, nalta jute, or tossa jute.

It is used as a vegetable and is mainly eaten in Egypt, the Levant (Lebanon, Syria, Palestine, Israel, Jordan, and Cyprus), Sudan, Libya, Tunisia, Nigeria, and Algeria. Mulukhiyah is rather bitter, and when boiled, the resulting liquid is a thick, highly mucilaginous broth; it is often described as "slimy", rather like cooked okra.

Mulukhiyah is generally eaten cooked, not raw, and it is either eaten chopped and sautéed in oil, garlic and cilantro as in Lebanon and Syria or turned into a kind of soup or stew like in Egypt, typically bearing the same name as the vegetable in the local language. It is attested in medieval Arabic cookbooks, including the 14th-century Egyptian Kanz al-fawāʾid fī tanwīʿ al-mawāʾid, where mulukhiyah is glossed as a meat stew with Jew's mallow.

Traditionally, mulukhiyah is cooked with chicken or at least chicken stock for flavor and is served with white rice, accompanied by lemon or lime. In Tunisia, the dish is prepared with jute powder instead of the leaves and cooked with lamb or beef to be served with bread. It is called saluyot in the Philippines. In Haiti, a dish prepared from jute leaves is called lalo.

== Origins and history ==
Most scholars are of the opinion that mulukhiyah's origins lie in Ancient Egypt, namely Corchorus capsularis, which is used for food as well as for fiber.

Mulukhiyah was a known dish in the Medieval Arab world. The recipe on how to prepare it is mentioned in the 14th-century Arabic book Kanz el-Fawa'ed fi Tanwi' el-Mawa'ed. According to the Egyptian historian al-Maqrizi (d. 1442), mulukhiyah was the favorite dish of caliph Muawiyah ibn Abi Sufyan (r. 661–680) the founder of the Umayyad Caliphate. Furthermore, on the 7th of Muharram in the year 395 AH (1005 AD) the Fatimid ruler of Egypt el-Hakem be Amr Ellah (The Governor by the Order of God)(r. 996–1021) issued a decree which prohibited his subjects from eating the mulukhiyah, which was thought to be an aphrodisiac. However, his successor caliph al-Zahir (r. 1021–1035) permitted the eating of mulukhiyah again. The Druze, who hold Al-Hakim in high regard and give him quasi-divine authority, continue to respect the ban, and do not eat mulukhiyah of any kind to this day.

== Culinary varieties ==
=== Egyptian cuisine ===
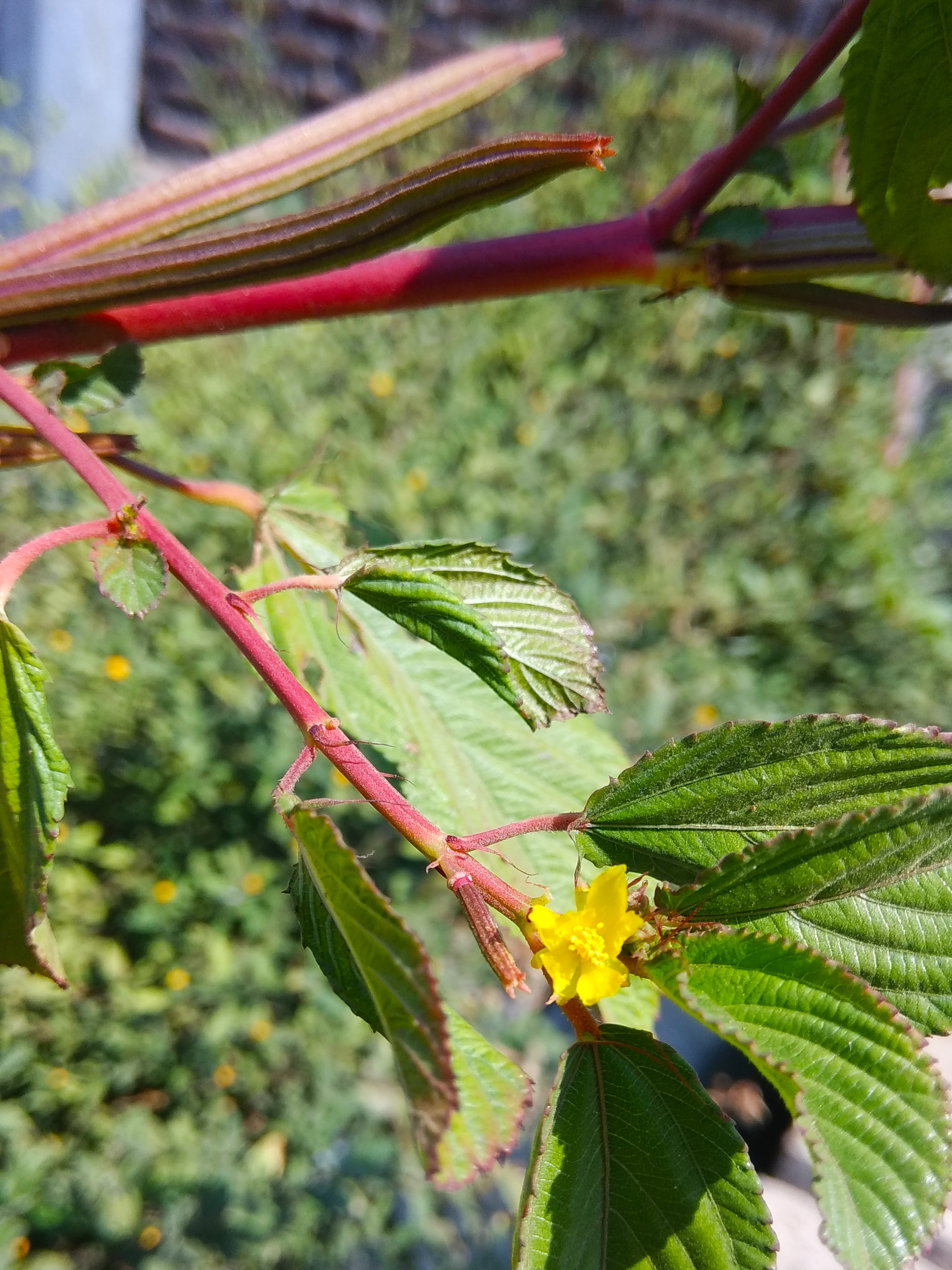

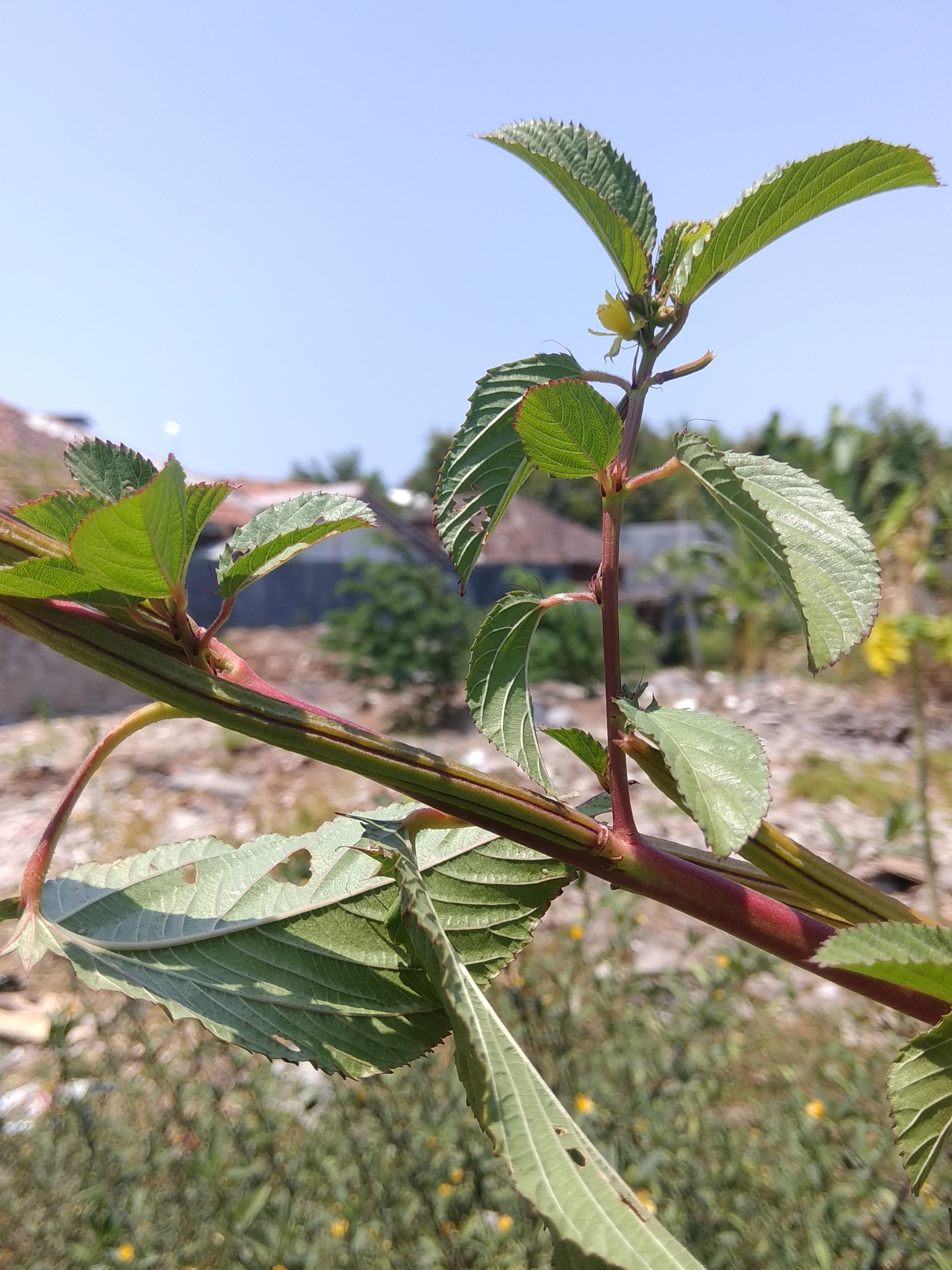

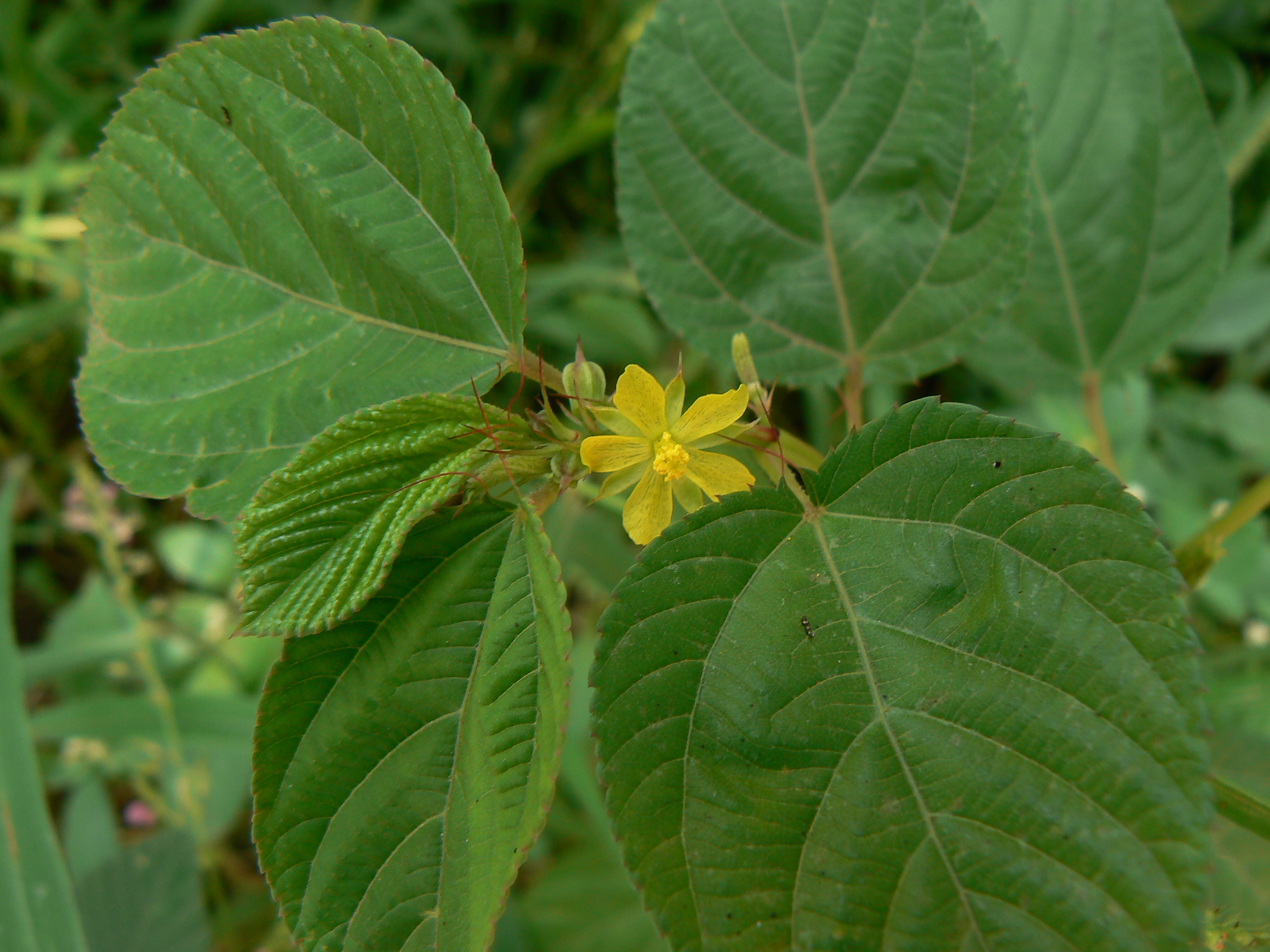

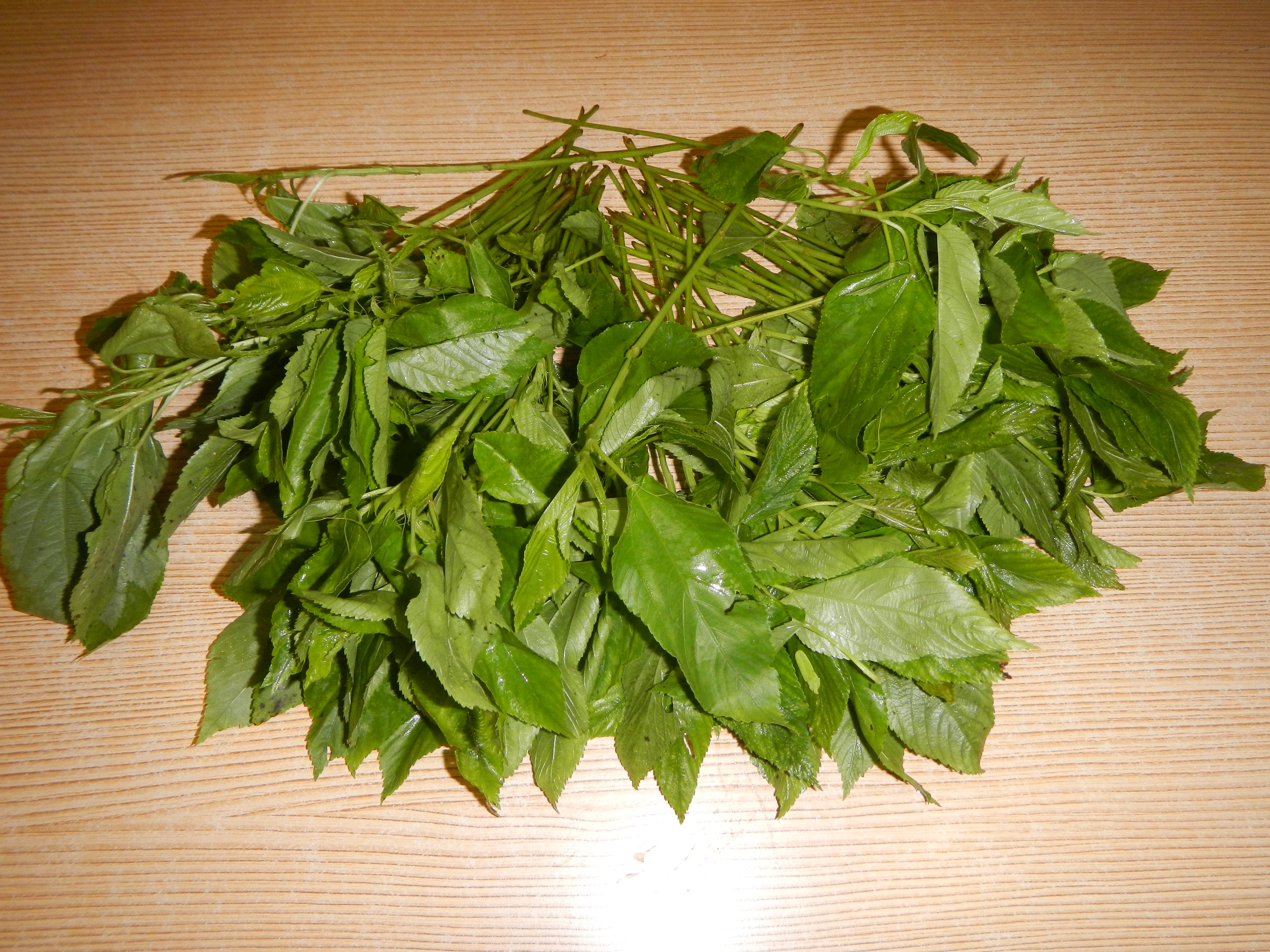

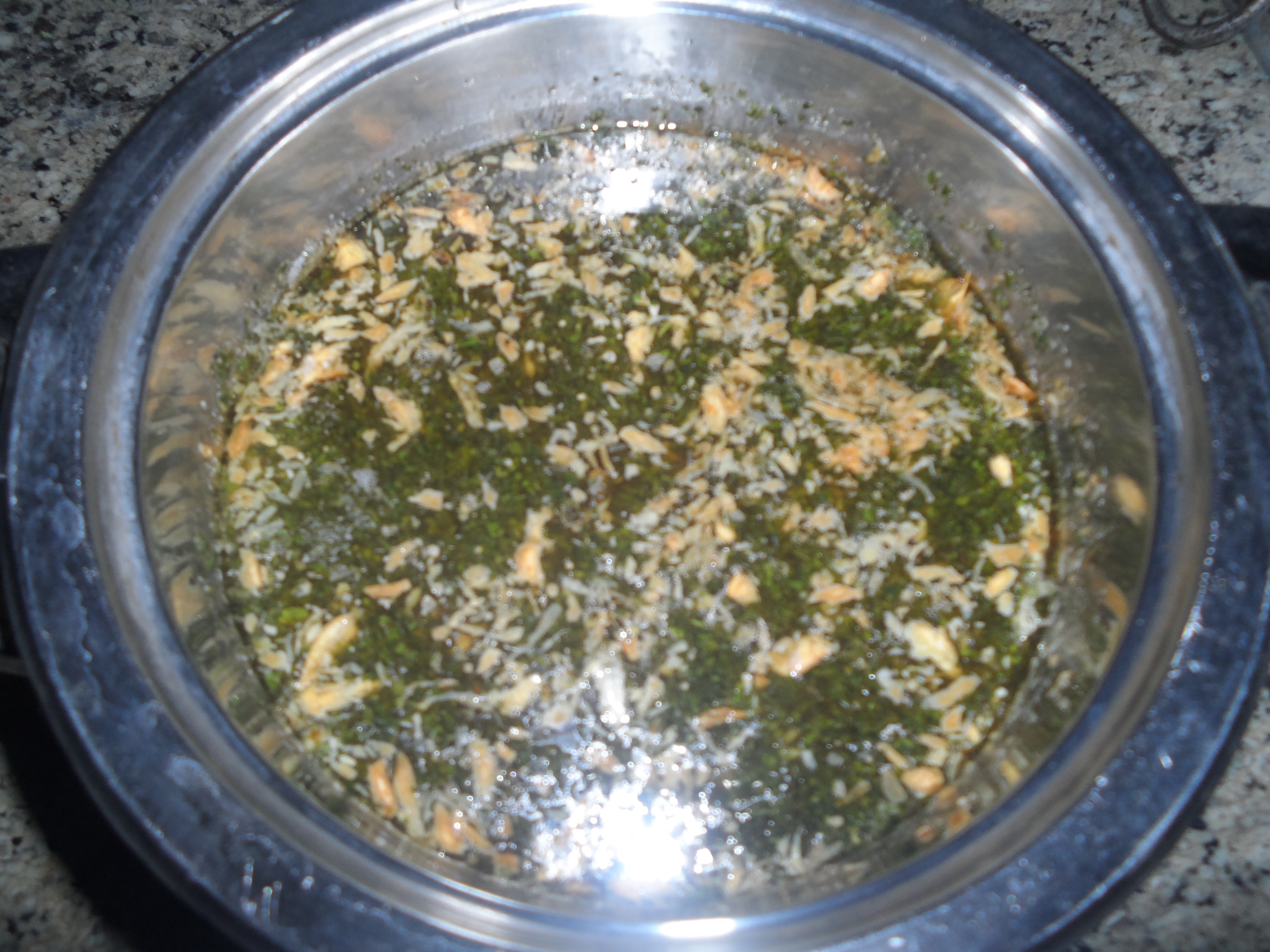

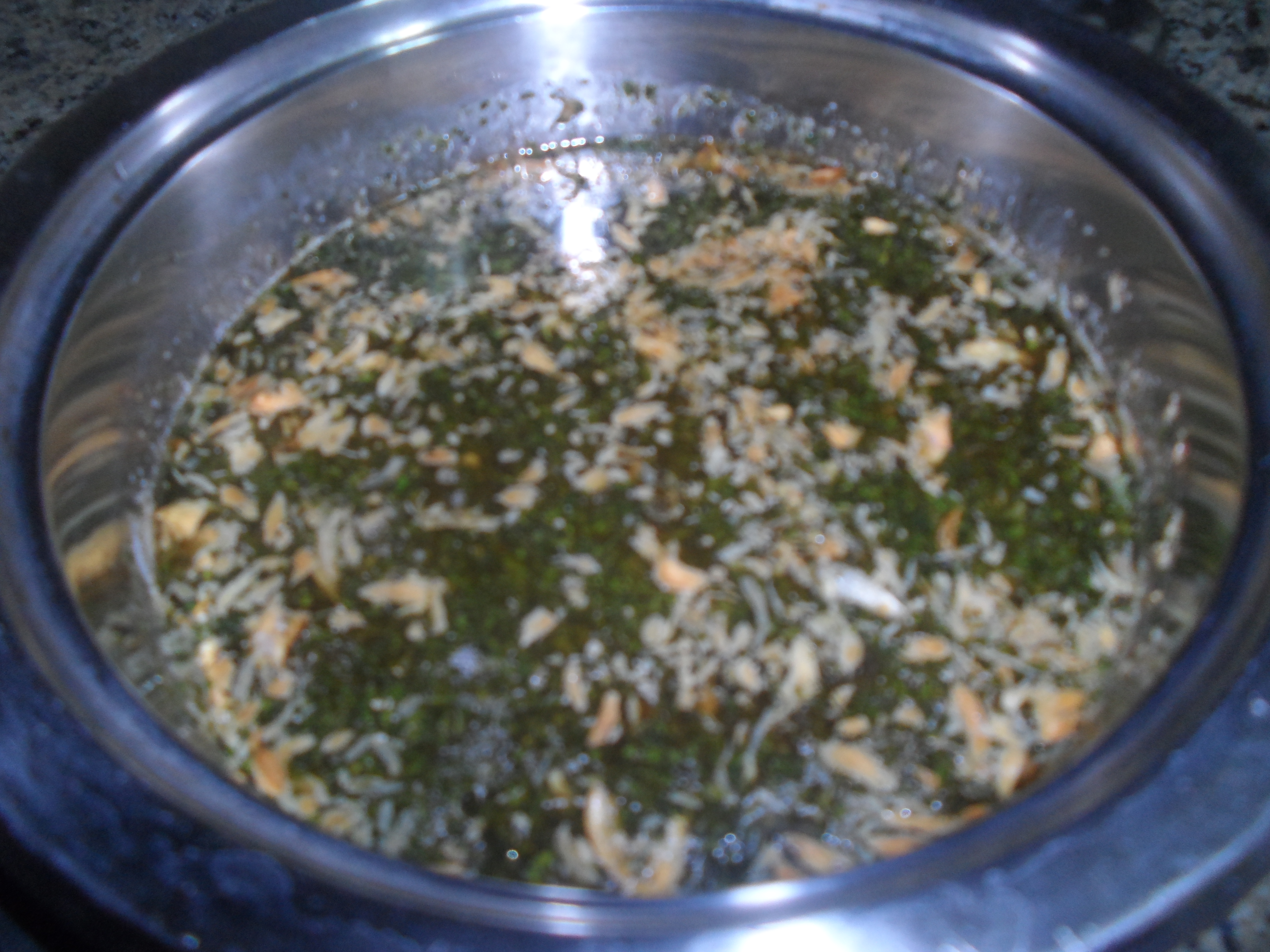

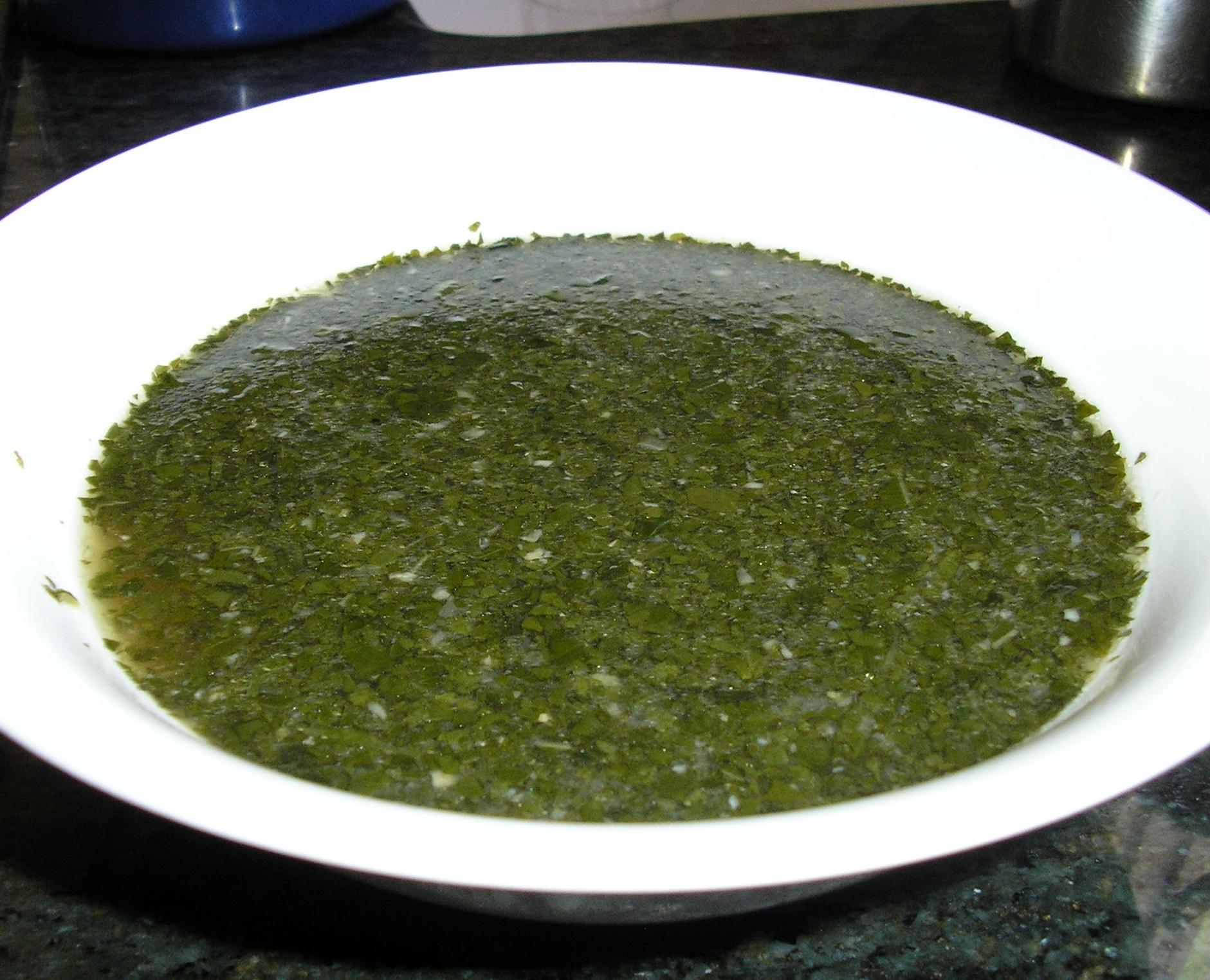
Egyptian Molokhiyya

As used in Egyptian cuisine, molokhiyya (Egyptian Arabic pronunciation: [moloˈxejjæ]) is prepared by removing the stem from the leaves, and then chopping the leaves finely. It is mixed with garlic and coriander. The dish generally includes some sort of meat; in Egypt, this is usually chicken or rabbit, but lamb is preferred when available, particularly in Cairo. Cooks in Alexandria often opt to use shrimp in the soup, while Port Said is famous for using fish.

Molokhiyya was consumed in ancient Egyptian cuisine, where the name "molokhiyya" is thought to have originated.

Many Egyptians consider molokhiyya to be the national dish of Egypt, along with ful medames and kushari.

The Egyptian style of preparing molokhiyya is distinctive, and is particularly different from the Levantine variant. The molokhiyya leaves are picked off the stem, with tall stemmed branches. Sometimes the leaves are dried for preservation by leaving them on a large sheet (cloth material) to be left to completely dry for later use. This is referred to as "dried molokhiyya". The dish can be prepared with both fresh and dried leaves, with some variation in taste.

Upon preparation the leaves are chopped finely, often with a mezzaluna. The leaves are then boiled in broth; if meat or seafood is being used, it is added at this point, and may be bone-in or boneless. Coriander and garlic are fried separately in ghee or oil to make the ta'leyya (تقليه, literally "a frying" or "fried thing"), and then added to the soup at the end while the ta'leyya is still sizzling.

The soup is served on cooked white rice or with a side of Egyptian flatbread (ʿeish baladi). The dish is often accompanied with an assortment of pickled vegetables, known as mekhallel or torshi in Egypt. Tomato sauce, vinegar, and other condiments may also be present.

=== Levantine cuisine ===
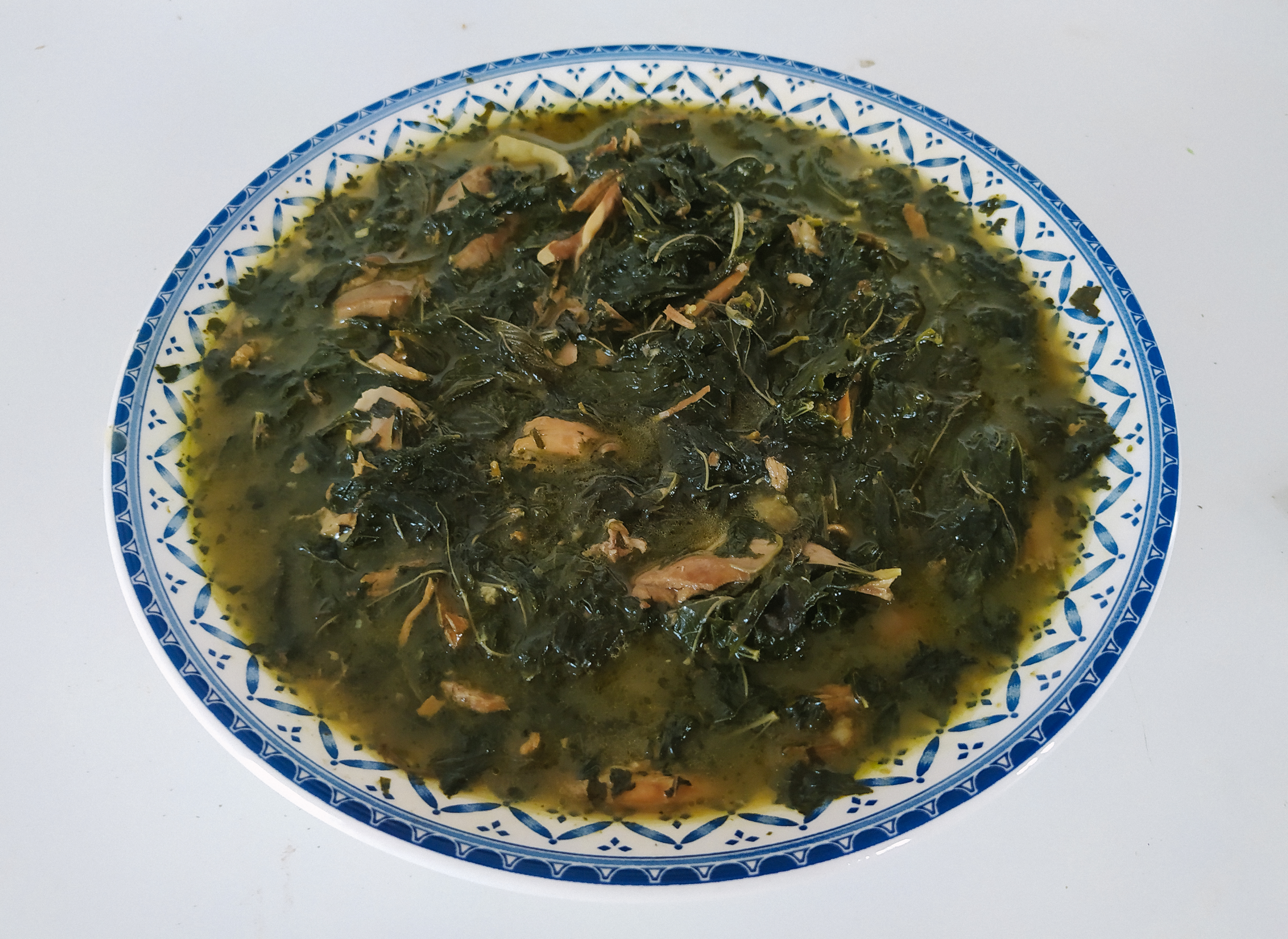
Levantine-style mulukhiya

The standard molokhia dish in the Levant is prepared by cooking a meat of some sort in a separate pot by boiling. Later garlic is cooked to a simmer, then water and chicken stock cubes are added to form a broth. After boiling, the cooked chicken or meat with the broth coriander and molokhia leaves are added and further cooked another 15 minutes. It is served with white rice and fresh lemon. Also, in northern Lebanon, a dish called mloukhiye b zeit is made using fresh leaves and shoots of the Nalta jute plant, cooked in olive oil, onions, garlic, tomatoes and chilli peppers; it is a popular summer side dish, especially in Miniyeh-Danniyeh and Akkar districts.

Bedouins have an old tradition of cooking a different version of the dish. A whole chicken is cut open, the intestines removed, and the innards stuffed with herbs, spices and raw rice then sewn shut with thick thread. The chicken is then boiled to create the broth for the molokhia soup which, after preparation, is served as five separate components: The molokhia soup, Arabic flat bread, the chicken (stuffed with flavored rice), additional plain rice, and a small bowl with a mixture of lemon juice and sliced chilli. The soup is mixed with rice and lemon juice according to taste, while the chicken is eaten on a separate plate.

=== Tunisia ===
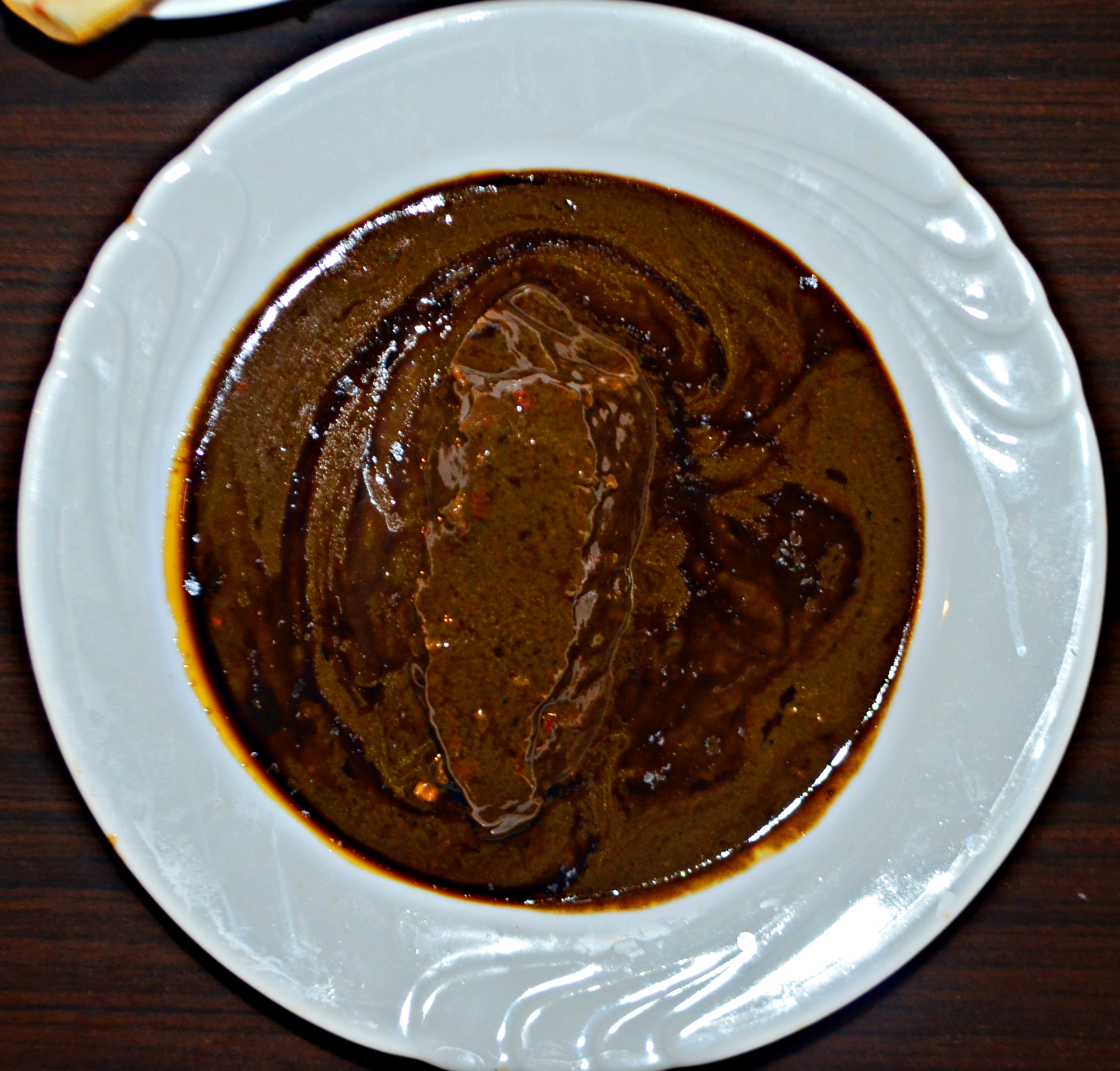
Tunisian molokhiyya

In Tunisia, the dish is generally prepared quite differently from the Egyptian method. The leaves, already separated from the stems, are dried then ground to produce a very fine powder and stored in jars or other tightly closed containers. The powder is prepared with olive oil and some sometimes tomato paste into a sauce, not soup, and big chunks of chuck beef are often added halfway through cooking. The dark green sauce simmers on low heat and is left to thicken to the consistency of tomato sauce. The sauce is served in small deep plates with a piece of beef and eaten with preferably white hearty traditional bread. In certain regions where beef is not common, lamb is used but cooks for a much shorter time.

=== Kenyan cuisine ===
In Kenya, the dish is known as murere (Luhya), murenda, apoth (Luo), and several other native language names. It is a very popular vegetable dish among communities in the Western region (Bungoma, Busia, Kakamega, Trans-Nzoia and Vihiga counties) and in Nyanza region (Homa Bay, Kisii, Kisumu, Migori, Nyamira and Siaya counties). Both regions are in the area around Lake Victoria. The jute leaves are separated from the stems, washed, and then boiled in lightly salted water with ligadi (a raw form of sodium bicarbonate), or munyu (traditional plant-based salt). The leaves are boiled with other leafy vegetables such as likuvi (cowpea leaves) or mito (chipilín) to reduce their sliminess and help soften the other vegetable leaves. In some cases, after boiling for about thirty minutes, the vegetables are stewed with tomatoes and onions in oil. (There are several general ways to prepare the mutere and more ways in which it is served). Spices such as curry, pepper, masala, or coriander are optional. Mutere is served with ugali (a staple stuff, cooked cereal meal) and can be accompanied with meat or chicken.

=== West African cuisines ===
Among the Yorubas in Nigeria, Benin and Togo it is called ewedu and served with cooked yam flour (amala). In Liberia, it is called palaver sauce, and is served with rice or fufu. In The Gambia, it is referred to as kereng-kereng and is typically used to make supakanja (a dish mostly served on Saturdays and made with okra, red palm oil, fish and meat).

In Ghana, it is known as ademe ewe or ayoyo leaves and used to make accompanying soups for banku (a corn cassavas dough dish) or cooked rice).

=== Cypriot cuisine ===
In Cyprus, the dish is known as molohiya. It is popular among the Greek Cypriots and Turkish Cypriots. The jute leaves are cultivated and grown in the spring, whereupon they are harvested and the leaves are separated from the stem and dried whole. They are cooked in a tomato-based broth with onions and garlic. Lamb on the bone or chicken with bone may also be added. For optimal results, lemon and potato are also used to help keep the consistency from becoming too mucilaginous or slimy. It is served with a broth consistency with sourdough bread.

=== Haitian cuisine ===
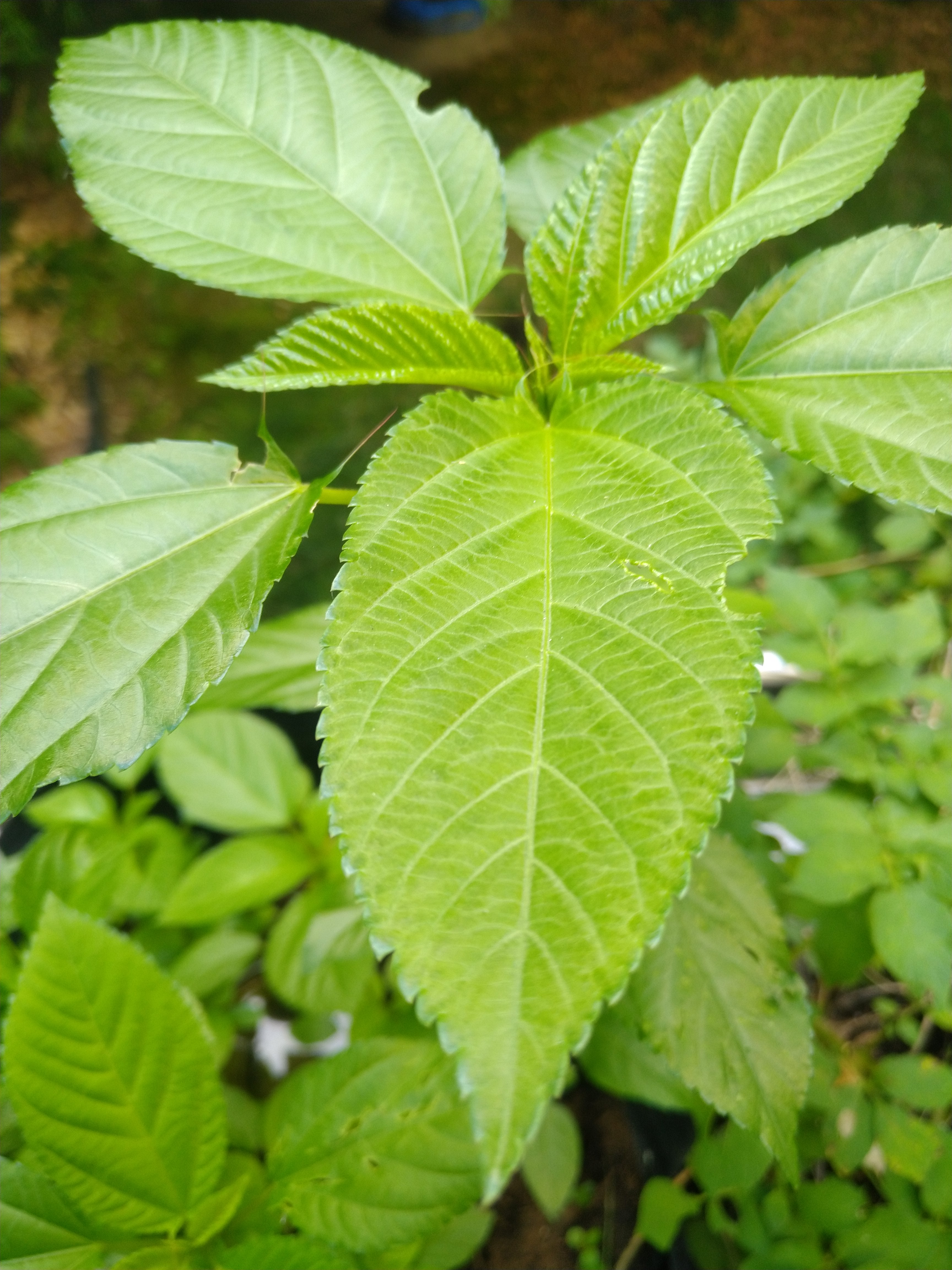
Plant

In Haiti, the leafy green dish is commonly known as Lalo and is traditionally cooked with or without meat. When considering meat, Haitians utilize beef or pork shoulder. Seafood such as blue crabs, shrimp or snow crab legs are also options. It is traditionally served with white rice.

== Nutrition ==
The leaves are rich in folate, beta-carotene, iron, calcium, vitamin C and more than 32 vitamins, minerals and trace elements. The plant has a potent antioxidant activity with a significant α-tocopherol equivalent vitamin E.

== Ancient references ==
The word for the plant is found in ancient Mediterranean languages such as Egyptian and Greek. Cognates of the word include Ancient Greek μαλάχη (malákhē) or μολόχη (molókhē), Modern Greek μολόχα (molókha), Egyptian Arabic ملوخيه (molokhiyyah) and Modern Hebrew מלוחיה (malukhia).

== See also ==
- List of Middle Eastern dishes
- List of African dishes
