= Eish baladi =

Traditional Egyptian flatbread

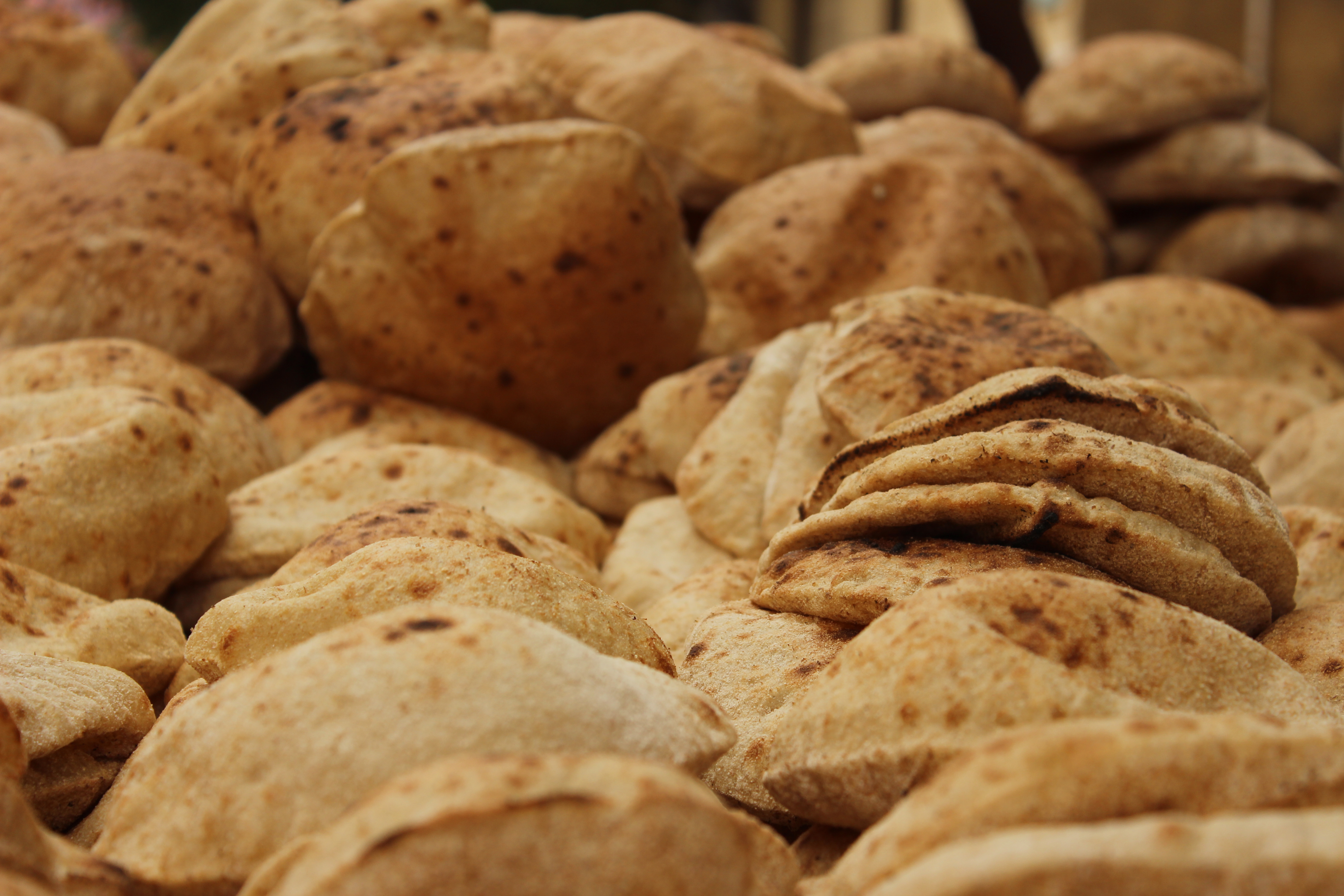
- Type: Pita
- Place of origin: Egypt
- Main ingredients: Wheat flour

Eish baladi (Egyptian Arabic: عيش بلدى) is a traditional Egyptian flatbread and is one of the oldest and most enduring staples in the country’s culinary history. It is renowned for its ubiquity and significance in Egyptian culture. As the most popular type of bread in Egypt, it has formed the backbone of Egyptian cuisine since ancient Egypt. Its widespread presence is also reflected in everyday urban scenes, such as in Cairo, where vendors are often seen cycling through traffic while balancing baskets containing numerous loaves of eish baladi.

The bread is a yeasted, pocket-style product distinguished by a wheat bran-rich crust. High baking temperatures cause the yeast-generated gas to expand rapidly when flat discs of dough are placed on hot stone oven floors, forcing the dough to form numerous bubbles that merge into one large pocket before setting.

Eish baladi is versatile in its culinary applications. Freshly baked, it is ideal for sandwiches, allowing for a variety of fillings. When torn by hand, it serves as an excellent accompaniment to dips and stews. Additionally, toasted or fried pieces of eish baladi can enhance soups, salads, or the traditional Egyptian dish known as fatta.

== Etymology ==
The word eish ("[ʕeːʃ]") comes from the Semitic root ع-ي-ش ʕ-Ī-Š with the meaning "to live, be alive." The word itself has the meaning of "life, way of living...; livelihood, subsistence" in Modern Standard and Classical Arabic; folklore holds that this synonymity indicates the centrality of bread to Egyptian life.

The term "baladi" (بلدى) derived from the Arabic word "balad" (بلد) meaning "homeland" or "country" conveys a profound sense of belonging, rootedness, and authenticity. In Egypt, where the term originates, baladi encompasses the essence of local culture, traditions, and everyday life, extending well beyond its literal translation. It is used to describe various facets of Egyptian identity, including food, dance, clothing, behavior, and language, all of which embody the intrinsic characteristics of the land and its people.

== History ==
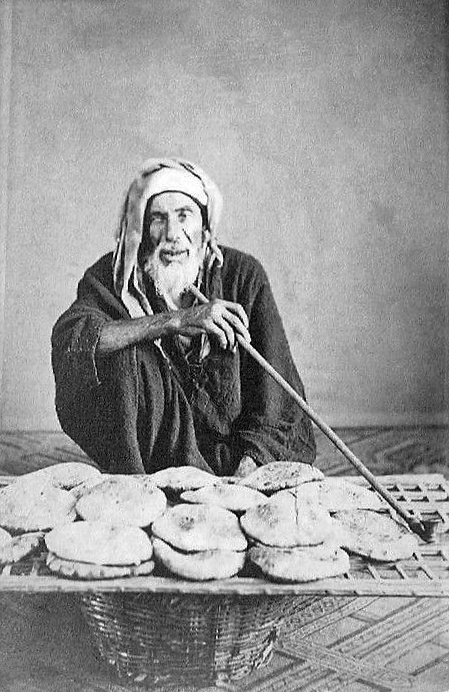
A vendor in Alexandria selling eish baladi in the 1870s

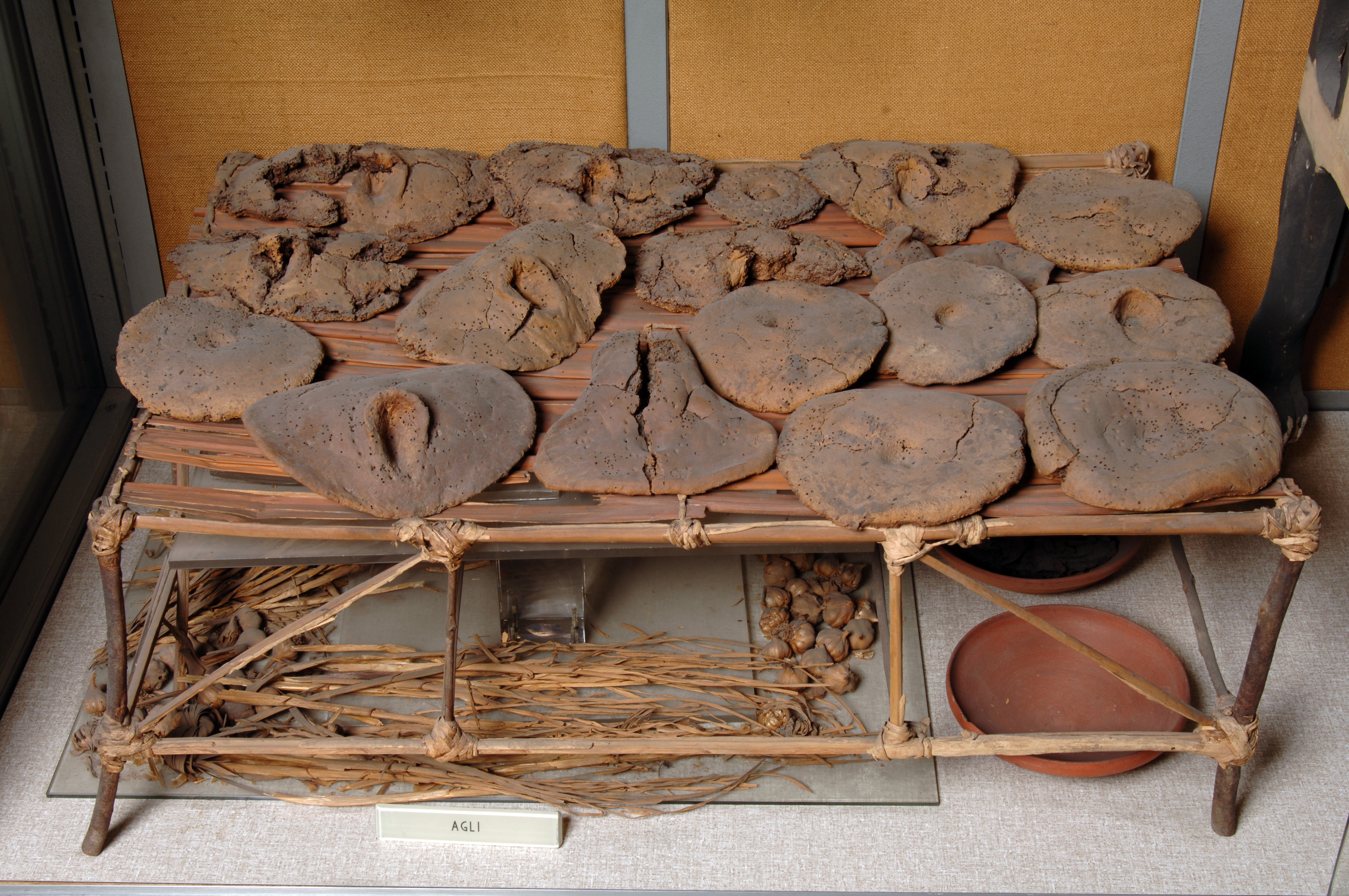
Bread loaves from the New Kingdom period, between 1425 and 1353 BC

From ancient Egypt to the present, bread has been the foremost staple in the Egyptian diet, consumed daily across all socioeconomic groups. Hieroglyphic records document at least fourteen types of bread, including leavened pita and pot-baked varieties used in temples and on special occasions. Bread and beer were so essential that they were used as currency to pay the pyramid builders, reflecting their centrality in daily life.

Eish baladi is a modern version of the flat, round bread produced and eaten by ancient Egyptians. Ancient Egyptians primarily used flour made from emmer wheat or barley, milled by hand using granite querns or saddle stones for breadmaking, which remains archaeologically attested through tomb illustrations and tool discoveries. Baking was done in open-topped clay ovens or cylindrical molds. Bread-making was a shared domestic responsibility, with women primarily engaged in milling when men were occupied with fieldwork. Evidence from the Amarna Workers' Village, dating to the reign of Akhenaten (c. 1350 BC), suggests that households were largely self-sufficient in producing their own bread, collaborating in grinding grain and baking.

Ancient Egyptians also pioneered techniques for natural fermentation, using flour and fruit juices rich in fructose to cultivate yeast for leavened bread. These same microbial methods were later used to brew acidic beer, today known as bouza or boozah in Egypt, made from lightly baked loaves of germinated grains.

Bread’s role extended beyond nutrition: it was part of religious offerings and grave goods, stockpiled in tombs alongside beer, fruit, and meat to ensure sustenance in the afterlife. Tomb paintings and analysis of settlements such as Amarna reveal collective baking practices and domestic self-sufficiency in bread production.

In modern Egypt, bread continues to play an outsized political and economic role. The term eish, meaning “life” in Arabic, reflects the centrality of bread to daily sustenance in Egypt. The government’s subsidy for eish baladi is one of the most sensitive national policies, with bread affordability and availability being a driving force behind mass uprisings, including the 1977 Egyptian bread riots and the 2011 Egyptian revolution.

Despite the introduction of modern baking techniques, traditional ovens remain prevalent, especially in rural and local markets.

== Preparation ==
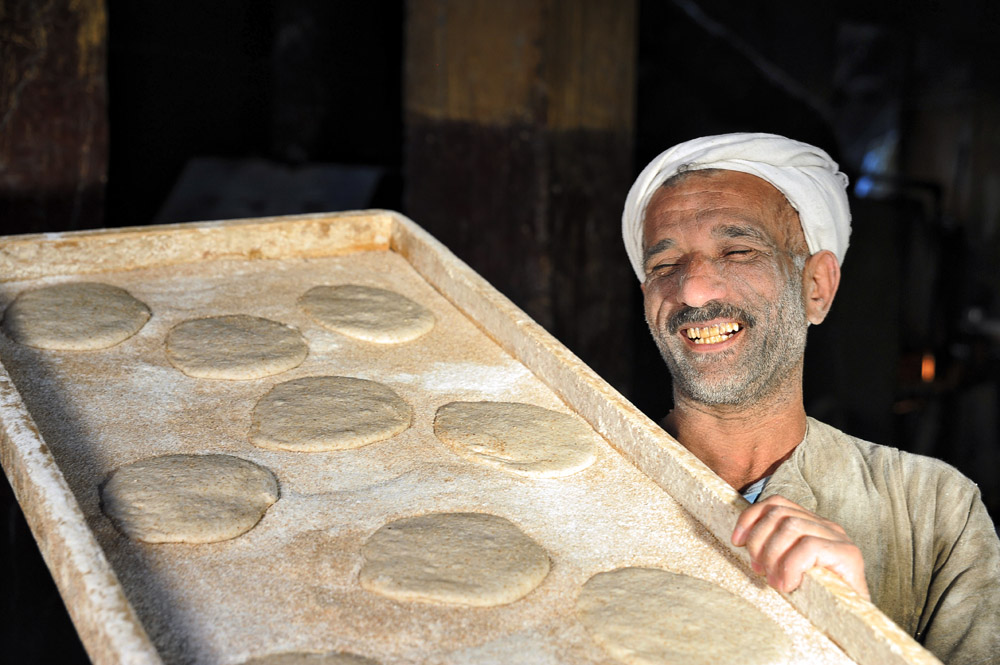
Eish baladi being prepared

The production of eish baladi typically begins with a pre-fermentation step, during which a small amount of commercial dried yeast is used to ferment a portion of the flour over an extended period. This pre-ferment enriches the dough’s flavor and improves its texture compared to a dough prepared without this technique. Additionally, up to 20% of whole wheat flour may be incorporated without significantly affecting the outcome, although higher proportions may necessitate adjustments in water content and can hinder the formation of the desired pocket structure.

In practice, a portion of the flour is initially mixed with water and a small pinch of yeast in a large bowl and left at room temperature for several hours until the mixture becomes frothy and slightly sour. Once the pre-ferment is ready, additional water, yeast, flour, and salt are incorporated, and the resulting dough is kneaded until smooth and elastic. After the dough has risen nearly to double its size, it is divided into equal portions, shaped into balls, and allowed to rest. Each ball is then rolled on a wheat bran-dusted surface into a thin disc and immediately baked on a hot surface until it puffs up and develops a lightly browned appearance.

== Culinary use ==
Eish baladi is served with a range of traditional Egyptian dishes. It is paired with stews such as molokhiya, and ful medames, and is also accompanied by dips such as hummus, baba ganoug, and tahini, providing a contrast in texture. The bread is served with grilled meats, including kebabs, kofta, and shawarma, and its thickness allows it to function as a wrap for meat, taʿmiyya and vegetables in sandwiches.

For lighter meals, it is served with cheeses such as aged white cheese, along with olives and fresh herbs, a combination common in Egyptian breakfasts. Its capacity to absorb flavors also renders it suitable for vegetable salads and mezze platters, where it is used to scoop chopped tomatoes, cucumbers, and onions dressed in olive oil and lemon juice. Although predominantly used with savory dishes, eish baladi may also be served with sweet spreads such as date syrup or honey, with its mild wheat flavor complementing the sweetness.

== See also ==
- Egyptian cuisine
