= Bouza (beer) =

Type of beer consumed in Egypt

Bouza بوظة
- Type: Beer
- Country of origin: Egypt
- Introduced: Predynastic Egypt
- Alcohol by volume: Up to 7%
- Ingredients: Barley and bread

Bouza (Egyptian Arabic: بوظة, also spelled buza) is a traditional Egyptian fermented grain beverage with roots stretching back to Predynastic Egypt. The drink has remained a popular among Egypt’s working class for millennia, today serving as an affordable alternative to commercial beer.

Despite its name resembling boza, a nonalcoholic fermented drink popular in Turkey and the Balkans, bouza is an entirely different beverage, distinguished by its alcoholic content. The ancient Egyptian word for malt was besa, which may have influenced the term bouza. In turn, bouza is considered a possible origin of the modern English word "booze."

== History ==
It is believed to be one of the earliest forms of beer, prepared from barley and bread. Archaeological evidence from Hierakonpolis, dating to the fourth millennium BCE, indicates that an early version of bouza was already present at the time.

In medieval Egypt, bouza was known by different names, including mizr and keshkab, the latter referring to a variation brewed with mint, lemon leaves, nigella, pepper or rue as gruit, consumed in coastal provinces.

In modern Egypt, its consumption has dwindled, and it is now primarily found in small, unlicensed roadside kiosks and working-class establishments.

Rich in iron and protein, bouza was historically both a source of sustenance and intoxication. While its presence has faded in mainstream Egyptian culture, it remains an enduring symbol of Egypt’s ancient brewing traditions.

== Preparation ==
The traditional method of brewing bouza has remained largely unchanged for over 5,000 years, resembling beer-brewing depictions found on ancient Egyptian murals.

It begins with malting grains, usually proso millet or a mix of malted and unmalted millets. The grains are left to sprout before being dried in the sun for several weeks, a crucial step in developing the necessary enzymes for fermentation. In some cases, the grains are germinated directly in soil before the matted roots are removed by hand. Once dried, the malt is rubbed to break it up and sifted to separate the fragments.

Next, the grains undergo light baking before being coarsely ground and kneaded into a dough. This dough is shaped into loaves and baked slightly, a step that preserves some of the yeast and enzyme activity. A portion of the grain is kept aside and wetted, allowing further malting to take place. Once ready, the green malt, either fresh or sun-dried, is crushed and combined with broken pieces of the baked bread and water, initiating the fermentation process.

Fermentation can occur naturally, but in many cases, a portion of previously brewed bouza is added to introduce beneficial microbes, speeding up the process. Over time, the mixture thickens and develops its characteristic consistency. The final step involves rough filtration, which removes coarse solids, leaving behind a dense, viscous liquid. Depending on fermentation time, bouza’s alcohol content can reach up to 7%. The final product is often flavored with herbs and dates.

== See also ==
- Beer in Egypt
