= Ceratonia oreothauma =

Scientific classification
- Kingdom: Plantae
- Clade: Tracheophytes
- Clade: Angiosperms
- Clade: Eudicots
- Clade: Rosids
- Order: Fabales
- Family: Fabaceae
- Subfamily: Caesalpinioideae
- Genus: Ceratonia
- Species: C. oreothauma

Binomial name
- Ceratonia oreothauma Hillc., G.P.Lewis & Verdc.

Species of legume

Ceratonia oreothauma is a species of tree native to Oman and Somaliland.

== Description ==
Ceratonia oreothauma is a small tree with gnarled branches and rough bark which grows up to 8 meters high. It is evergreen, with singly-pinnate leaves bearing up to 20 leaflets.

Ceratonia oreothauma flowers in March and April. Flowers are either purely male or purely female, with minute and sterile primary anthers.

== Distribution and habitat ==
Ceratonia oreothauma has two widely separated populations which are classified as separate subspecies. C. oreothauma ssp. oreothauma is found in a single valley on Jebel Aswad in the eastern Hajar Mountains of Oman between 900 and 2000 meters elevation. C. oreothauma subsp. somalensis occurs in the mountains of Somaliland between 1500 and 1800 meters elevation.

== Conservation ==
The population trend of subspecies oreothauma is not well understood. The eastern portion of its population is in Wadi Siren Nature Reserve. The northwestern portion of the population is not regenerating. The subspecies is considered Vulnerable.

The known populations of subspecies somalensis in Somaliland are very small. Its habitat is unprotected, and is under pressure from human use. The subspecies is considered Endangered.

== Systematics ==
Ceratonia has one other species, Ceratonia siliqua or carob, which is distributed around the Mediterranean. C. oreothauma is morphologically distinct from C. siliqua. In addition the pollen grains of C. oreothauma are slightly smaller than those of C. siliqua and are tricolporate rather than tetracolporate.
