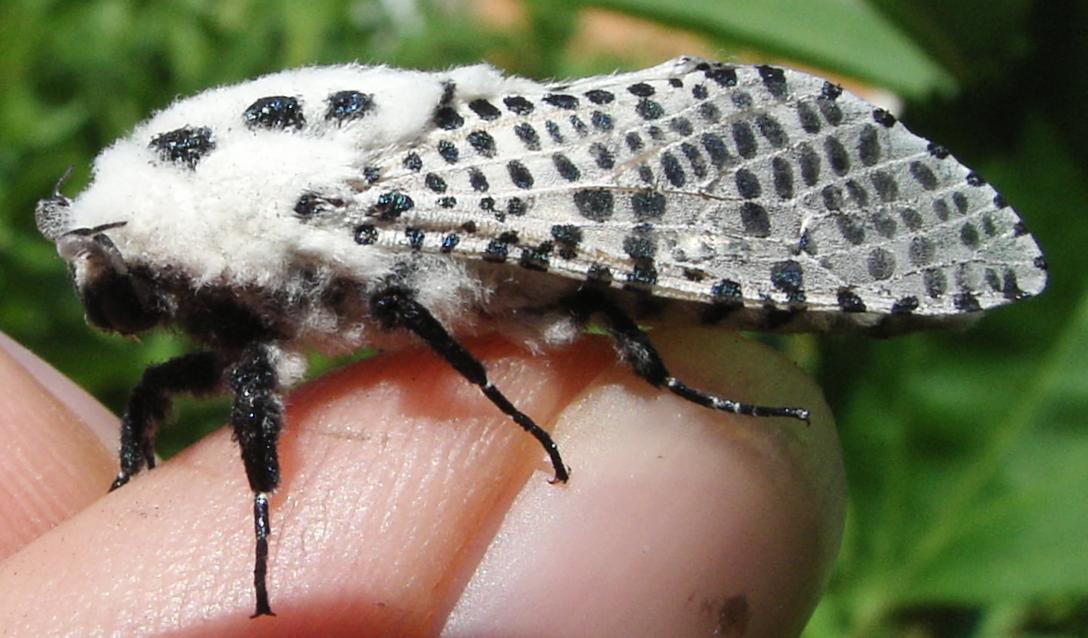
- Zeuzera pyrina

Scientific classification
- Kingdom: Animalia
- Phylum: Arthropoda
- Class: Insecta
- Order: Lepidoptera
- Family: Cossidae
- Subfamily: Zeuzerinae
- Genus: Zeuzera; Latreille, 1804

Species
- See text

Synonyms
- Latagia Hübner, 1820; Aegolia Billberg, 1820; Premnopsyche Scott, 1864; Zenzera Latreille, [1805]; Zenzera Moore, 1879; Zenzera Butler, 1881; Zeugzera Stichel, 1918-1919; Zeucera Spuler, 1910

= Zeuzera =

Genus of moths

Zeuzera is an Old World genus of moths belonging to the family Cossidae.

== Species ==
- Zeuzera biebingeri Speidel et Speidel, 1986
- Zeuzera lineata Gaede, 1933
- Zeuzera multistrigata Moore, 1881
- Zeuzera nepalense Daniel, 1962
- Zeuzera nuristanensis Daniel, 1964
- Zeuzera pyrina (Linnaeus, 1761)
- Zeuzera qinensis Hua, Chou, Fang et Chen, 1990
- Zeuzera yuennani Daniel, 1940

== Former species ==
- Zeuzera ariana Grum-Grshimailo, 1899
- Zeuzera coffeae Nietner, 1861
- Zeuzera conferta Walker, 1856
- Zeuzera indica Herrich-Schaeffer, 1854
- Zeuzera innotata Walker, 1865
- Zeuzera nubila Staudinger, 1895
- Zeuzera rhabdota Jordan, 1932
- Zeuzera stigmatica Moore, 1879
