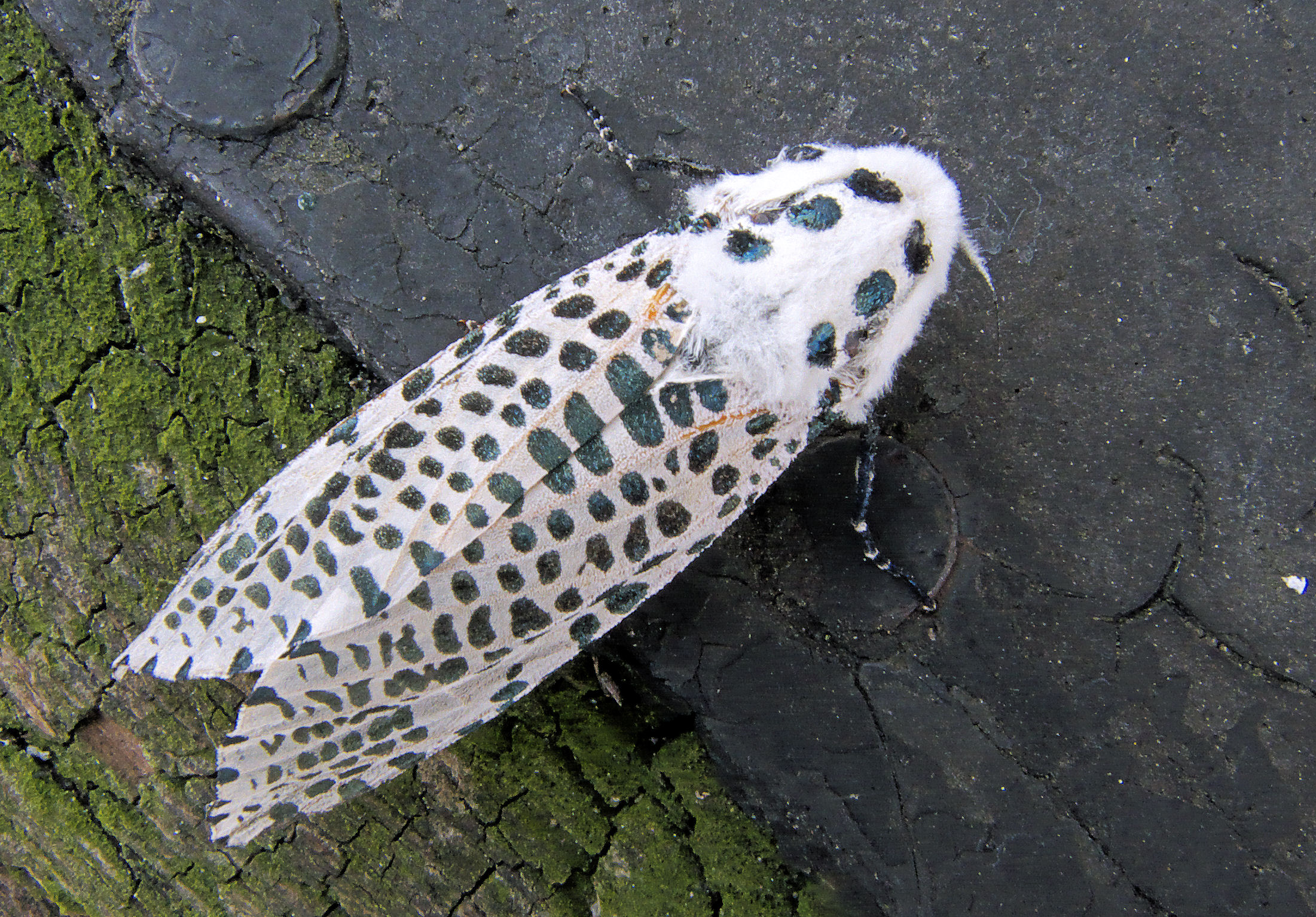
- Upperside
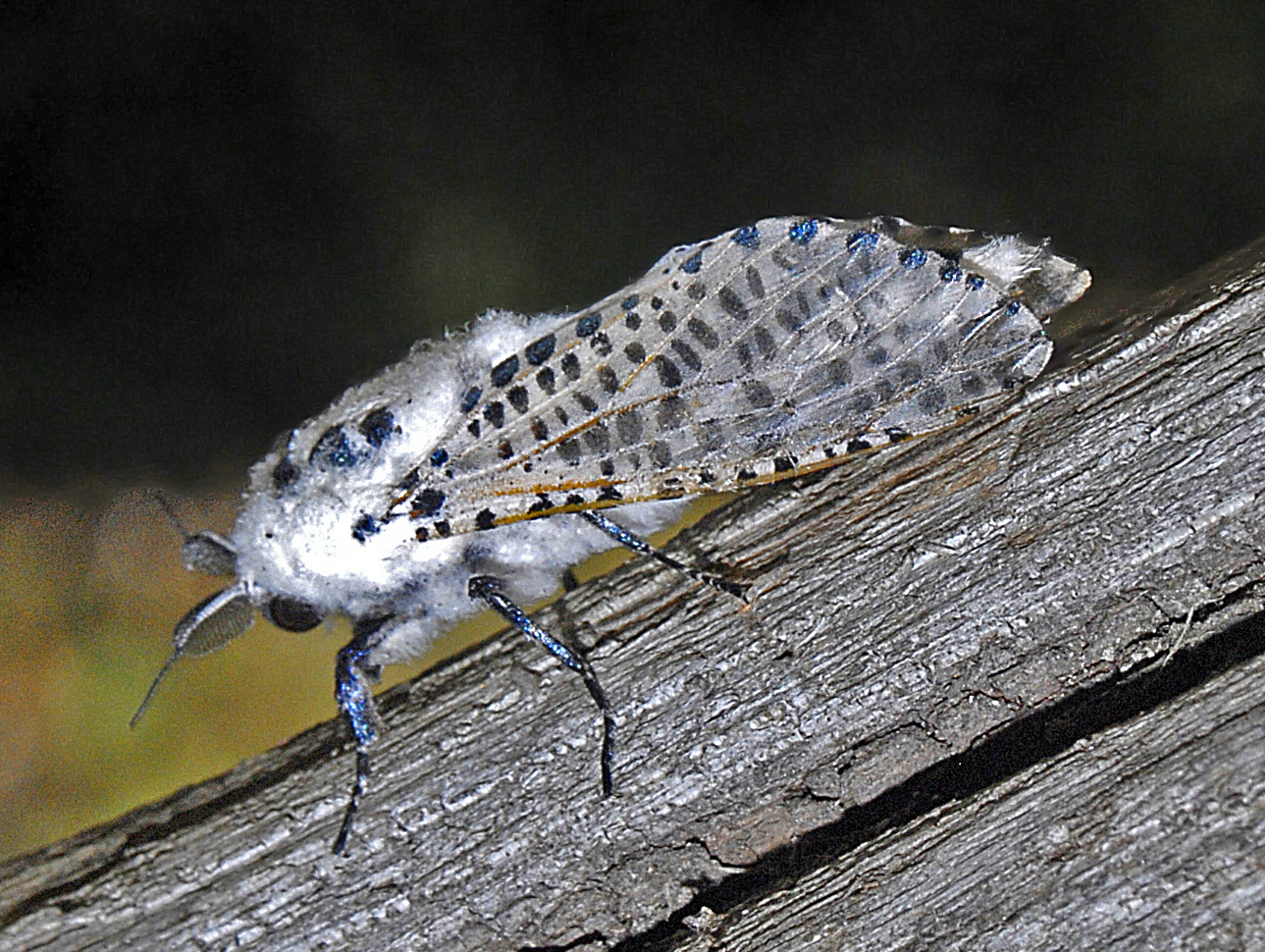
- Lateral view

Scientific classification
- Kingdom: Animalia
- Phylum: Arthropoda
- Class: Insecta
- Order: Lepidoptera
- Family: Cossidae
- Genus: Zeuzera
- Species: Z. pyrina

Binomial name
- Zeuzera pyrina (Linnaeus, 1761)

Synonyms
- List: Phalaena pyrina Linnaeus, 1761; Phalaena aesculi Linnaeus, 1767; Zeuzera decipiens Kirby, 1892; Noctua hypocasstani Poda, 1761; Zeuzera hypocastrina Dyar, 1902; Phalaena hilaris Geoffroy in Fourcroy, 1785; Zeuzera octopunctata Boisduval, [1841]; Zeuzera pirina Staudinger, 1879; Zeuzera esculi Staudinger, 1895; Zeuzera pyrina ab. conflua Schultz, 1905; Zeuzera yprina Stichel, 1918; Zeuzera yprina f. paulomaculata Stichel, 1918; Zeuzera pyrina ab. confluens Cockayne, 1955; Zeuzera pyrina f. marginestriata Lempke, 1961; Zeuzera pyrinia El-Hariri, 1968

= Zeuzera pyrina =

Leopard moth

Species of moth

Zeuzera pyrina, the leopard moth or wood leopard moth, is a moth of the family Cossidae.

It is considered a pest by fruit growers, as the larvae feed on branches of many kinds of fruit trees. Olive trees in particular are very susceptible and can be killed by the larvae burrowing within them.

== Subspecies ==
Subspecies include:

- Zeuzera pyrina biebingeri (W. & A. Speidel, 1986)
- Zeuzera pyrina pyrina (Linnaeus, 1761)

Zeuzera biebingeri is treated as a subspecies of Z. pyrina by some sources, but is mostly treated as a valid species.

== Distribution ==
This species can be found primarily in Europe (excluding Ireland) but also in northern Africa (Algeria, Egypt, Libya, Morocco) and Asia (Taiwan, India, Iran, Iraq, Israel, Japan, Korea, Lebanon, Sri Lanka, Syria, Turkey). It was introduced into the northeastern United States prior to 1879 and has a range including Maine, Pennsylvania, Tennessee and Texas.

== Habitat ==
These moths are associated with woodland, gardens and orchards.

== Description ==
Zeuzera pyrina has a wingspan of 35–60 millimetres (1.4–2.4 in). They are a highly distinctive species. The length of the abdomen of the female is about 45–50 millimetres (1.8–2.0 in). The male is slightly smaller than the female, with broader and more feathery antennae. These moths have a white head, with a black forehead and a very furry white thorax marked with six black spots. The abdomen is black, with short white hair-like scales on the posterior edge of each segment and a flat brush of scales on the apex. Forewings are whitish, long and narrow, with numerous black spots or black spots with white interior spots, arranged in rows along the veins. Hindwings are translucent, except in the anal area, with small black spots. They have an average wingspan of about 35–60 millimetres (1.4–2.4 in). Their antennae are bipectinate and wide at their base, but narrow near their tips, especially in males.

== Biology ==
The moth flies from June to September depending on the location. The caterpillars are xylophagous. They feed on the wood of various deciduous trees and shrubs (see list below), feeding internally for two or three years in the stems and branches before emerging to pupate under the bark. They can be a pests in fruit production.

== Recorded host plants ==
Recorded food plants include:

- Acer
- Aesculus
- Amelanchier
- Broussonetia
- Carya
- Castanea
- Celtis
- Ceratonia
- Cotoneaster
- Crataegus
- Cydonia
- Fagus
- Fraxinus
- Ilex
- Juglans
- Ligustrum
- Liquidambar
- Liriodendron
- Lonicera
- Malus
- Olea
- Prunus
- Punica
- Pyrus
- Quercus
- Rhododendron
- Ribes
- Robinia
- Rubus
- Salix
- Syringa
- Tilia
- Ulmus
- Viburnum

== Gallery ==
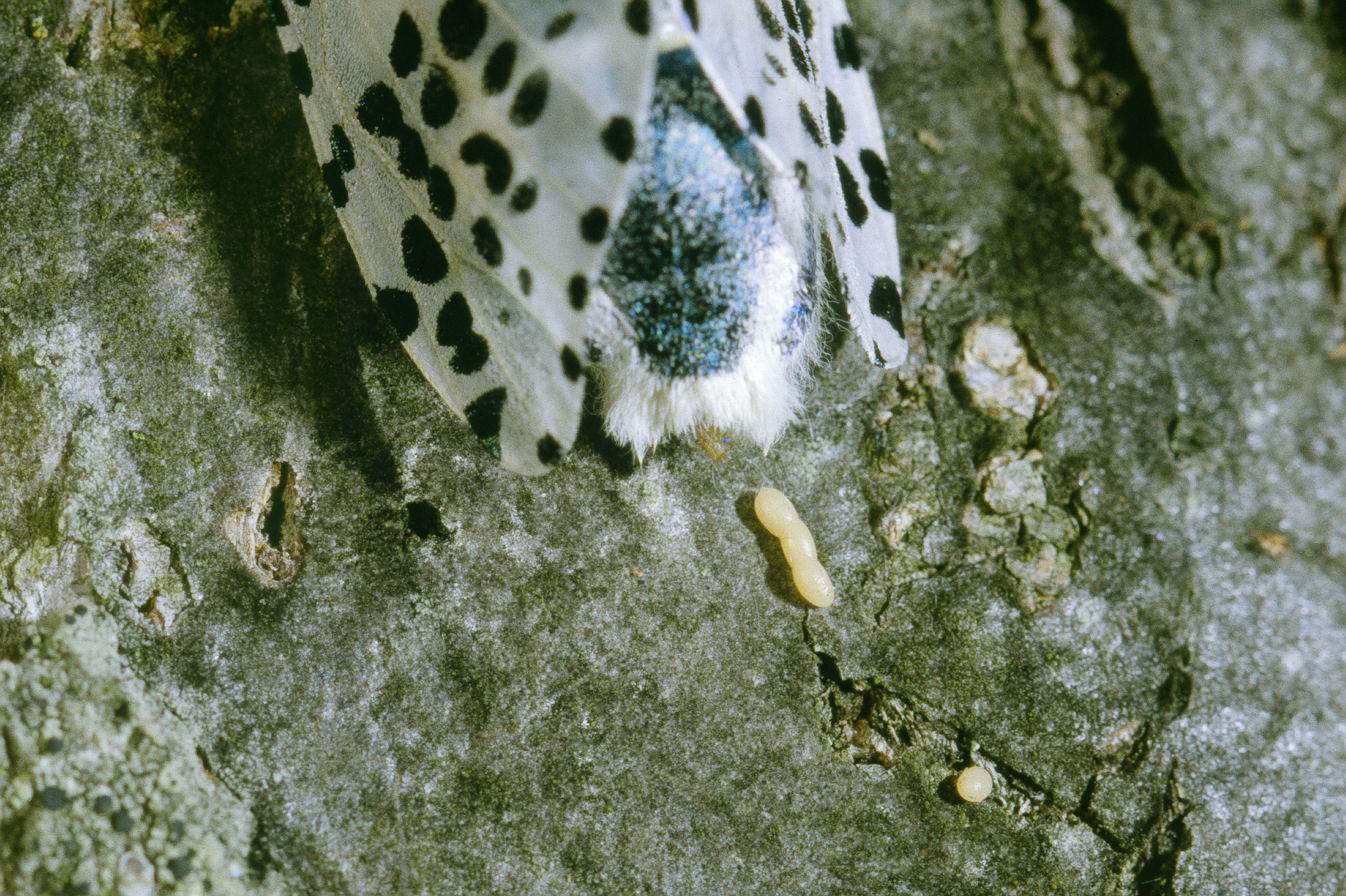
Egg-laying

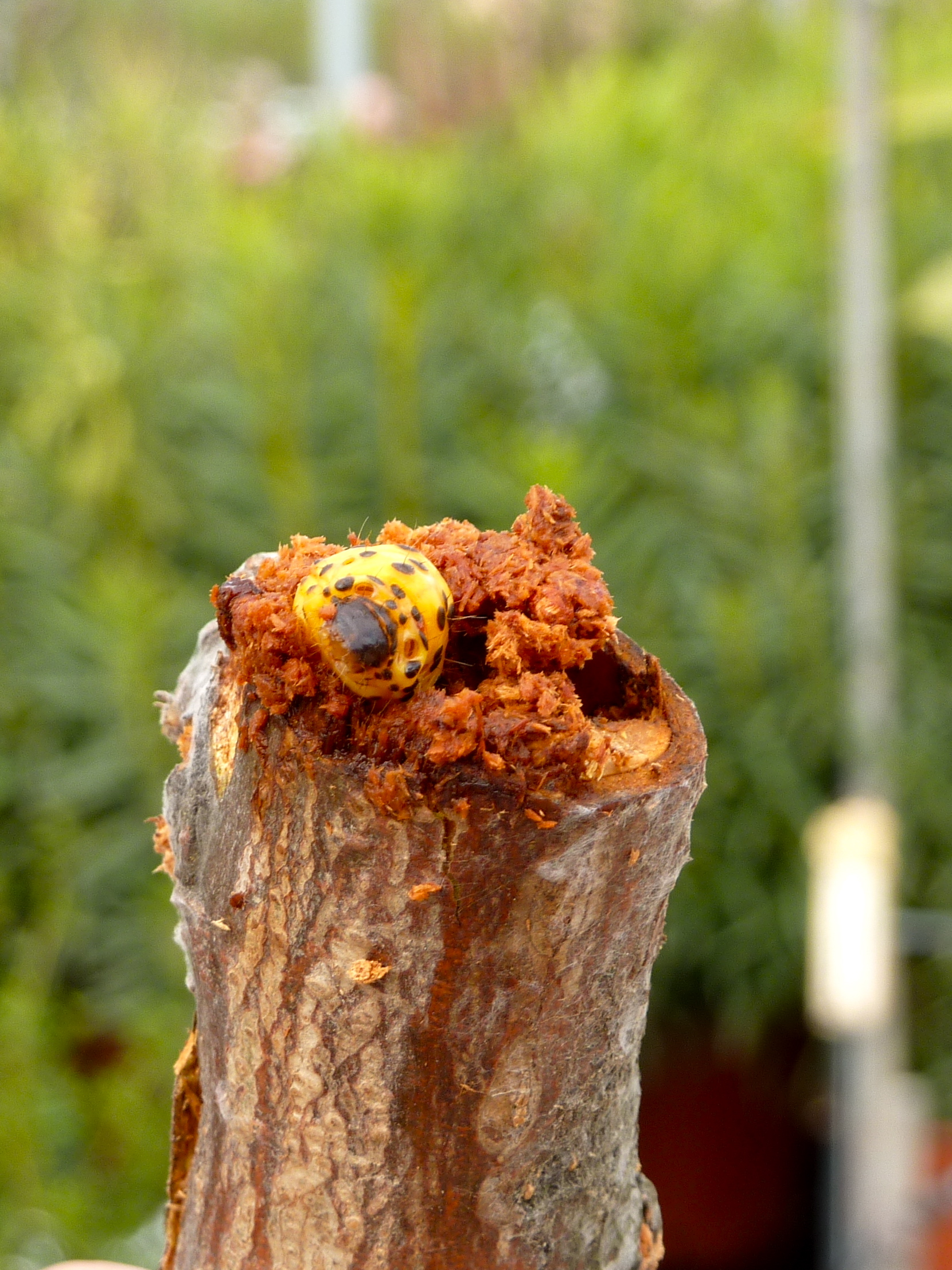
Caterpillar in a stem of an apple tree.

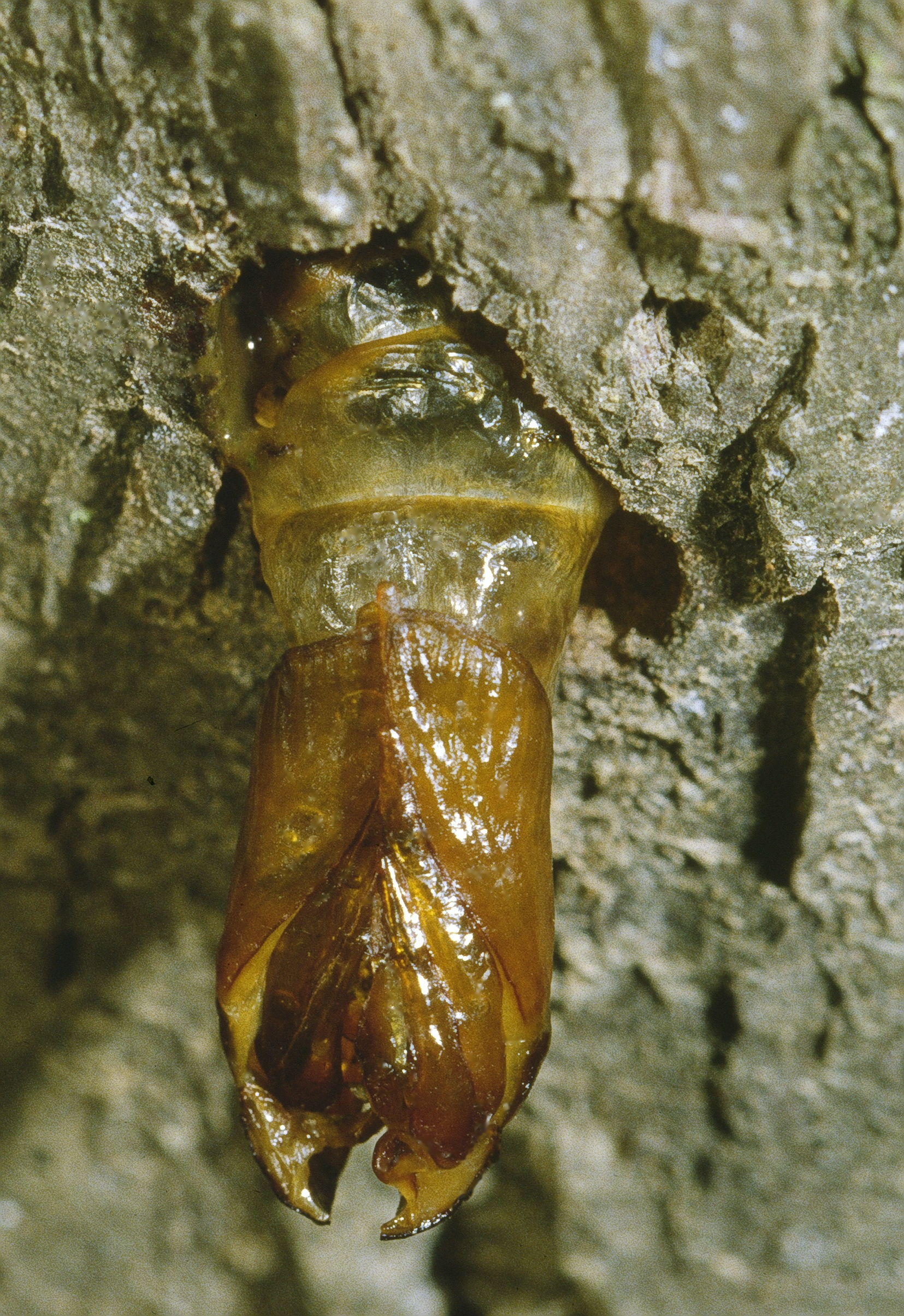
Exuvia

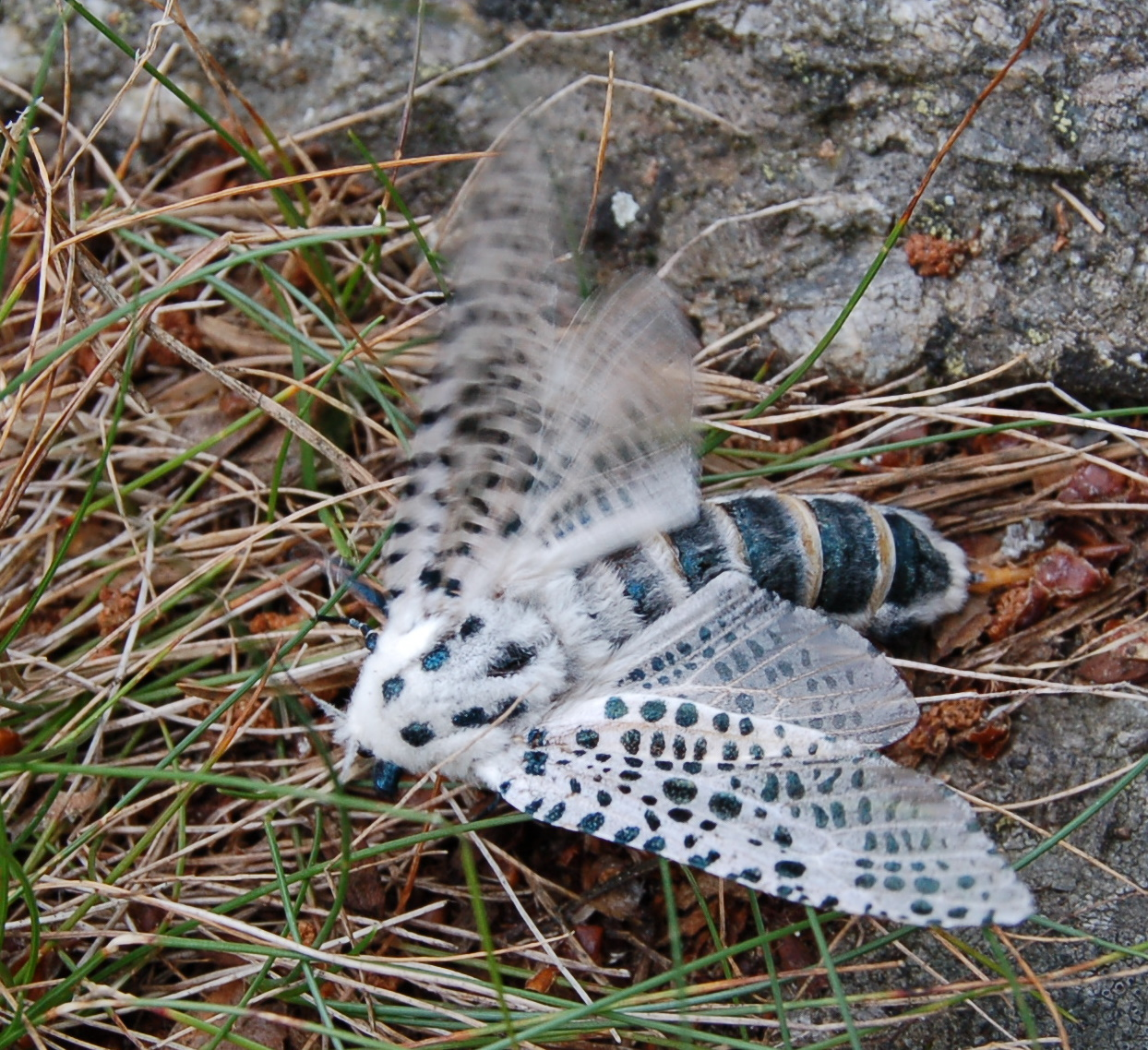
Moth

== Bibliography ==
- Skinner, Bernard (1984). Colour Identification Guide to Moths of the British Isles. Viking Press. p. 3. ISBN 0-670-80354-5.
- Waring, Paul; Townsend, Martin (2003). Field Guide to the Moths of Great Britain and Ireland. British Wildlife Publishing. p. 22. ISBN 0-9531399-2-1.
- Capinera, J. L. (Ed.), Encyclopedia of Entomology, 4 vol., 2nd Ed., Dordrecht, Springer Science+Business Media B.V., 2008, pp. lxiii + 4346, ISBN 978-1-4020-6242-1, LCCN 2008930112, OCLC 837039413.
- Lieutier F., Day K. R., Battisti A., Grégoire J.-C. and Evans H. F. (Eds.), Bark and Wood Boring Insects in Living Trees in Europe, a Synthesis, ristampa 1ª ed., Dordrecht; Boston, Springer; Kluwer Academic Publishers, 2007 [2004], pp. xiv, 569, ISBN 978-1-4020-2240-1, LCCN 2004051536, OCLC 55645086.
- Scoble, M. J., The Lepidoptera: Form, Function and Diversity, 2nd ed., London, Oxford University Press & Natural History Museum, 2011 [1992], pp. xi, 404, ISBN 978-0-19-854952-9, LCCN 92004297, OCLC 25282932.
- Stehr, F. W. (Ed.), Immature Insects, 2 vol., Dubuque, Iowa, Kendall/Hunt Pub. Co., 1991 [1987], pp. ix, 754, ISBN 978-0-8403-3702-3, LCCN 85081922, OCLC 13784377.
