= Kharob =

Beverage made from carob consumed in Egypt and the Levant

Kharob خروب
- Origin: Egypt and the Levant
- Colour: Light brown
- Ingredients: Carob, water, sugar

Kharob (Arabic: خروب) is a traditional beverage widely enjoyed in Egypt and the Levant, especially during the month of Ramadan. Made from the pods of the carob tree, this drink is celebrated for its naturally sweet, chocolate-like flavor and purported health benefits.

There is some evidence that the beverage was consumed in ancient Egypt, and also that carob was used as a sweetener in other beverages.

== Preparation ==
In Egypt kharob is prepared by first washing and breaking the carob pods into smaller pieces. These pieces are then roasted until they emit a fragrant aroma. In a separate pot, sugar is caramelized over medium heat until it reaches a golden brown color. The roasted carob pieces are added to the caramelized sugar, and the mixture is stirred continuously. Water is gradually added, ensuring the sugar dissolves completely. The mixture is brought to a boil and then allowed to simmer for a short period. After cooling to room temperature, it is refrigerated for several hours. Once chilled, the mixture is strained to remove solid particles, resulting in a smooth, refreshing beverage.

Alternatively, if whole carob pods are unavailable, carob molasses are used in Lebanon. By diluting a tablespoon of carob molasses in water and adding a teaspoon of brown sugar, a quick and flavorful version of the drink can be prepared.

Kharob is not only valued for its taste but also for its nutritional properties. Rich in fiber, antioxidants, and free from caffeine, it serves as a wholesome alternative to other sugary drinks. Its natural sweetness and health benefits make it a popular choice in Egypt.
