= Phragmacossia ihlei =

Scientific classification
- Kingdom: Animalia
- Phylum: Arthropoda
- Clade: Pancrustacea
- Class: Insecta
- Order: Lepidoptera
- Family: Cossidae
- Genus: Phragmacossia
- Species: P. ihlei

Binomial name
- Phragmacossia ihlei Yakovlev, 2008

Species of moth

Phragmacossia ihlei is a species of moth of the family Cossidae. It is found in Thailand.
