= Phragmacossia minos =

Scientific classification
- Kingdom: Animalia
- Phylum: Arthropoda
- Class: Insecta
- Order: Lepidoptera
- Family: Cossidae
- Genus: Phragmacossia
- Species: P. minos

Binomial name
- Phragmacossia minos Reisser, 1962

Synonyms
- Phragmataecia minos; Phragmacossia albida minos Reisser, 1962

Species of moth

Phragmacossia minos is a species of moth of the family Cossidae. It is found on Crete.
