= Phragmacossia kiplingi =

Scientific classification
- Kingdom: Animalia
- Phylum: Arthropoda
- Clade: Pancrustacea
- Class: Insecta
- Order: Lepidoptera
- Family: Cossidae
- Genus: Phragmacossia
- Species: P. kiplingi

Binomial name
- Phragmacossia kiplingi Yakovlev, 2011

Species of moth

Phragmacossia kiplingi is a species of moth of the family Cossidae. It is found in Sri Lanka.
