= Phragmacossia dudgeoni =

Scientific classification
- Domain: Eukaryota
- Kingdom: Animalia
- Phylum: Arthropoda
- Class: Insecta
- Order: Lepidoptera
- Family: Cossidae
- Genus: Phragmacossia
- Species: P. dudgeoni

Binomial name
- Phragmacossia dudgeoni (Arora, 1974)

Synonyms
- Phragmataecia dudgeoni Arora, 1974

Species of moth

Phragmacossia dudgeoni is a species of moth of the family Cossidae. It is found in India and Bhutan.
