= Zeuzera nepalense =

Scientific classification
- Domain: Eukaryota
- Kingdom: Animalia
- Phylum: Arthropoda
- Class: Insecta
- Order: Lepidoptera
- Family: Cossidae
- Genus: Zeuzera
- Species: Z. nepalense

Binomial name
- Zeuzera nepalense Daniel, 1962

Species of moth

Zeuzera nepalense is a moth in the family Cossidae. It was described by Franz Daniel in 1962. It is found in Nepal.
