= Phragmacossia paghmana =

Scientific classification
- Domain: Eukaryota
- Kingdom: Animalia
- Phylum: Arthropoda
- Class: Insecta
- Order: Lepidoptera
- Family: Cossidae
- Genus: Phragmacossia
- Species: P. paghmana

Binomial name
- Phragmacossia paghmana Daniel, 1963

Species of moth

Phragmacossia paghmana is a species of moth of the family Cossidae. It is found in Afghanistan and Pakistan.
