= Phragmacossia libani =

Scientific classification
- Domain: Eukaryota
- Kingdom: Animalia
- Phylum: Arthropoda
- Class: Insecta
- Order: Lepidoptera
- Family: Cossidae
- Genus: Phragmacossia
- Species: P. libani

Binomial name
- Phragmacossia libani Daniel in Zerni, 1933

Species of moth

Phragmacossia libani is a species of moth of the family Cossidae. It is found in Lebanon and Iraq.
