= Phragmacossia micromaculata =

Scientific classification
- Kingdom: Animalia
- Phylum: Arthropoda
- Clade: Pancrustacea
- Class: Insecta
- Order: Lepidoptera
- Family: Cossidae
- Genus: Phragmacossia
- Species: P. micromaculata

Binomial name
- Phragmacossia micromaculata Yakovlev, 2009

Species of moth

Phragmacossia micromaculata is a species of moth of the family Cossidae. It is found in Afghanistan.
