= Phragmacossia territa =

Scientific classification
- Domain: Eukaryota
- Kingdom: Animalia
- Phylum: Arthropoda
- Class: Insecta
- Order: Lepidoptera
- Family: Cossidae
- Genus: Phragmacossia
- Species: P. territa

Binomial name
- Phragmacossia territa Staudinger, 1878

Synonyms
- Phragmacossia albida territa Staudinger, 1878; Phragmatoecia territa; Phragmataecia territa transcaspica Grum-Grshimailo, 1895; Phragmataecia albidaferrita Dalla-Torre, 1923

Species of moth

Phragmacossia territa is a species of moth of the family Cossidae. It is found in Lebanon, Syria, Israel, Jordan, Egypt, Iran, Turkey, Turkmenistan, Uzbekistan, Tajikistan and Kyrgyzstan.

Adults have been recorded on wing in August and December in Israel.
