= Zeuzera nuristanensis =

Scientific classification
- Domain: Eukaryota
- Kingdom: Animalia
- Phylum: Arthropoda
- Class: Insecta
- Order: Lepidoptera
- Family: Cossidae
- Genus: Zeuzera
- Species: Z. nuristanensis

Binomial name
- Zeuzera nuristanensis Daniel, 1964

Species of moth

Zeuzera nuristanensis is a moth in the family Cossidae. It was described by Franz Daniel in 1964. It is found in Afghanistan and southern Pakistan.
