= Phragmacossia fansipangi =

Scientific classification
- Kingdom: Animalia
- Phylum: Arthropoda
- Clade: Pancrustacea
- Class: Insecta
- Order: Lepidoptera
- Family: Cossidae
- Genus: Phragmacossia
- Species: P. fansipangi

Binomial name
- Phragmacossia fansipangi Yakovlev & Witt, 2009

Species of moth

Phragmacossia fansipangi is a species of moth of the family Cossidae. It is found in northern Vietnam.
