= Phragmacossia =

Scientific classification
- Domain: Eukaryota
- Kingdom: Animalia
- Phylum: Arthropoda
- Class: Insecta
- Order: Lepidoptera
- Family: Cossidae
- Subfamily: Zeuzerinae
- Genus: Phragmacossia; Schawerda, 1924

Genus of moths

Phragmacossia is a genus of moths in the family Cossidae.

== Species ==
- Phragmacossia ariana (Grum-Grshimailo, 1899)
- Phragmacossia brahmana Yakovlev, 2009
- Phragmacossia dudgeoni (Arora, 1974)
- Phragmacossia fansipangi Yakovlev & Witt, 2009
- Phragmacossia furiosa (Sheljuzhko, 1943)
- Phragmacossia ihlei Yakovlev, 2008
- Phragmacossia kiplingi Yakovlev, 2011
- Phragmacossia libani Daniel in Zerni, 1933
- Phragmacossia laklong Yakovlev, 2014
- Phragmacossia micromaculata Yakovlev, 2009
- Phragmacossia minos Reisser, 1962
- Phragmacossia paghmana Daniel, 1963
- Phragmacossia territa (Staudinger, 1879)
- Phragmacossia tigrisia Schawerda, 1924
- Phragmacossia vartianae Daniel, 1963
