= Phragmacossia tigrisia =

Scientific classification
- Domain: Eukaryota
- Kingdom: Animalia
- Phylum: Arthropoda
- Class: Insecta
- Order: Lepidoptera
- Family: Cossidae
- Genus: Phragmacossia
- Species: P. tigrisia

Binomial name
- Phragmacossia tigrisia Schawerda, 1924

Species of moth

Phragmacossia tigrisia is a species of moth of the family Cossidae. It is found in Iraq.
