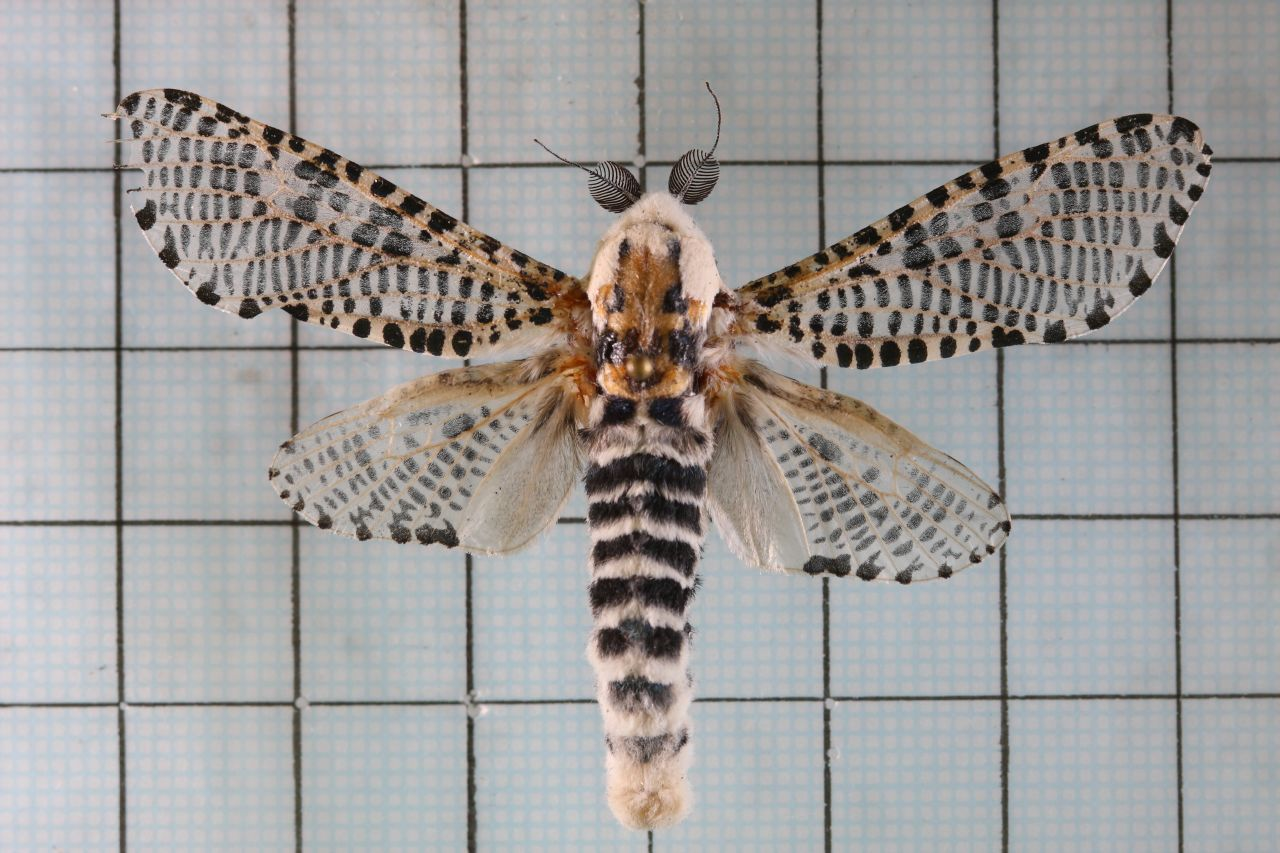

Scientific classification
- Domain: Eukaryota
- Kingdom: Animalia
- Phylum: Arthropoda
- Class: Insecta
- Order: Lepidoptera
- Family: Cossidae
- Genus: Zeuzera
- Species: Z. multistrigata

Binomial name
- Zeuzera multistrigata Moore, 1881

Synonyms
- Zenzera multistrigata Moore, 1881; Zeuzera multistrigaria Swinhoe, 1895

= Zeuzera multistrigata =

Species of moth

Zeuzera multistrigata is a moth of the family Cossidae. It is found in India, Nepal, Myanmar, Bangladesh, Sri Lanka, Vietnam, Thailand, China, Korea, Russia, Japan and Taiwan.

The wingspan is 35 mm for males and 70 mm for females.

The larvae feed on Casuarina equisetifolia.

== Subspecies ==
- Zeuzera multistrigata multistrigata (India, Pakistan, Nepal, China, Taiwan, Myanmar, Bangladesh, Sri Lanka, Vietnam, Thailand)
- Zeuzera multistrigata leuconota Butler, 1881 (Japan, south-eastern Russia, north-eastern China, Korea)
