= Phragmacossia furiosa =

Scientific classification
- Domain: Eukaryota
- Kingdom: Animalia
- Phylum: Arthropoda
- Class: Insecta
- Order: Lepidoptera
- Family: Cossidae
- Genus: Phragmacossia
- Species: P. furiosa

Binomial name
- Phragmacossia furiosa (Sheljuzhko, 1943)

Synonyms
- Phragmataecia furiosa Sheljuzhko, 1943

Species of moth

Phragmacossia furiosa is a species of moth of the family Cossidae. It is found in Afghanistan and Tajikistan.
