= Zeuzera yuennani =

Scientific classification
- Domain: Eukaryota
- Kingdom: Animalia
- Phylum: Arthropoda
- Class: Insecta
- Order: Lepidoptera
- Family: Cossidae
- Genus: Zeuzera
- Species: Z. yuennani

Binomial name
- Zeuzera yuennani Daniel, 1940

Species of moth

Zeuzera yuennani is a moth in the family Cossidae. It was described by Franz Daniel in 1940. It is found in China (Yunnan) and southern Vietnam.
