= Zeuzera lineata =

Scientific classification
- Domain: Eukaryota
- Kingdom: Animalia
- Phylum: Arthropoda
- Class: Insecta
- Order: Lepidoptera
- Family: Cossidae
- Genus: Zeuzera
- Species: Z. lineata

Binomial name
- Zeuzera lineata Gaede, 1933

Species of moth

Zeuzera lineata is a moth in the family Cossidae. It was described by Max Gaede in 1933. It is found in Malaysia, Vietnam and on Sumatra.
