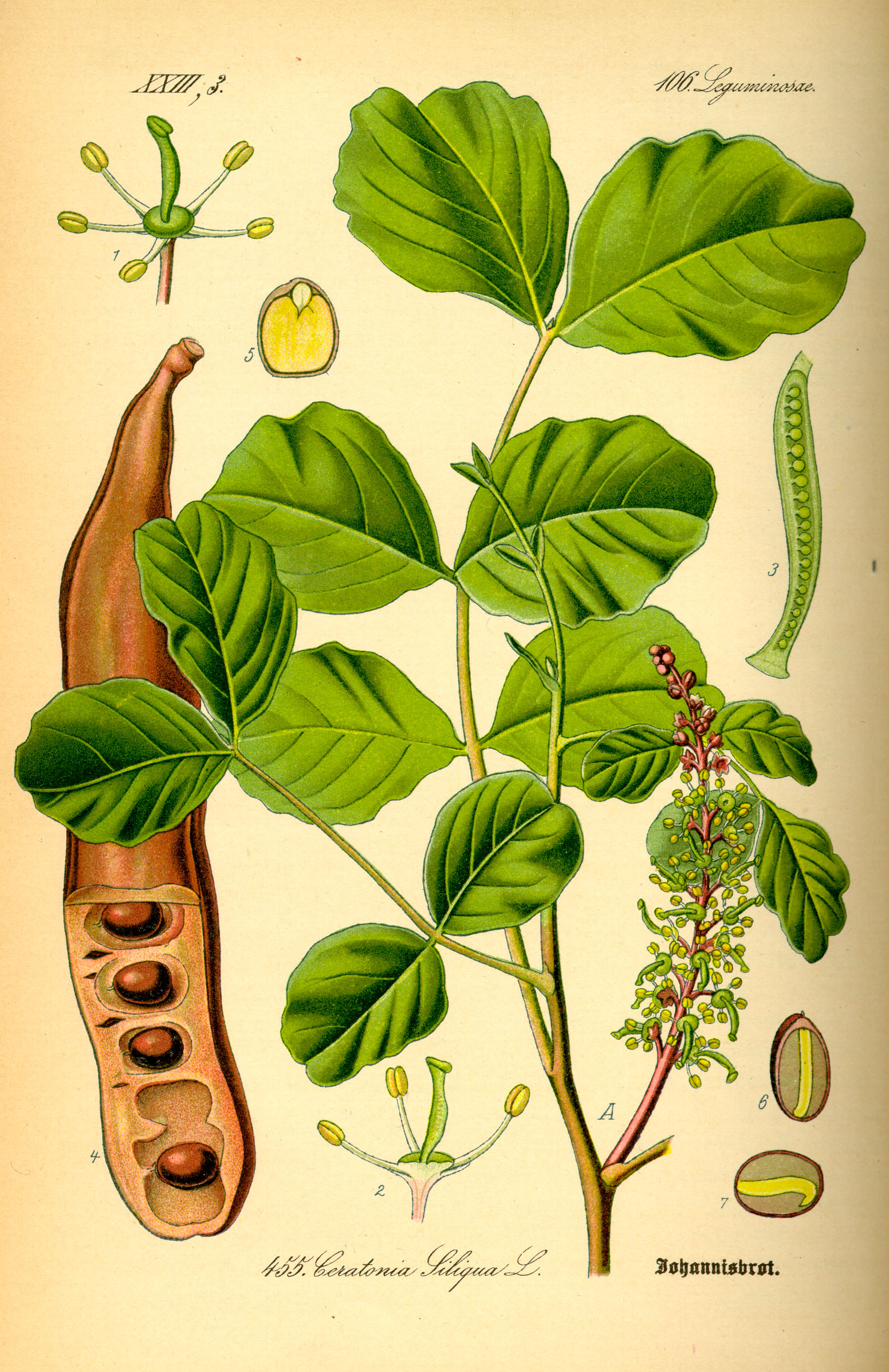
- Carob tree (Ceratonia siliqua)

Scientific classification
- Kingdom: Plantae
- Clade: Tracheophytes
- Clade: Angiosperms
- Clade: Eudicots
- Clade: Rosids
- Order: Fabales
- Family: Fabaceae
- Subfamily: Caesalpinioideae
- Genus: Ceratonia; L. (1753)

Species
- Ceratonia oreothauma Hillc., G.P.Lewis & Verdc.; Ceratonia siliqua L.; †Ceratonia emarginata

Synonyms
- Ceratia Adans. (1763); Siliqua Duhamel (1755), nom. superfl.

= Ceratonia =

Genus of legumes

Ceratonia /ˌsɛrəˈtoʊniə/, also known as carobs, is a small genus of flowering trees in the pea family, Fabaceae, endemic to the Mediterranean region and the Middle East. Its best known member is the carob tree (Ceratonia siliqua), which is cultivated for its edible pods and has been widely introduced to regions with similar climates. The genus was long considered monotypic, but a second species, Ceratonia oreothauma, was identified in 1979 from Oman and Somalia. The genus is in subfamily Caesalpinioideae and tribe Umtizieae.

An obsolete name for Ceratonia was Acalis.

== Fossil record ==
†Ceratonia emarginata fossils are known from the Miocene of Switzerland and Hungary.

== Images ==
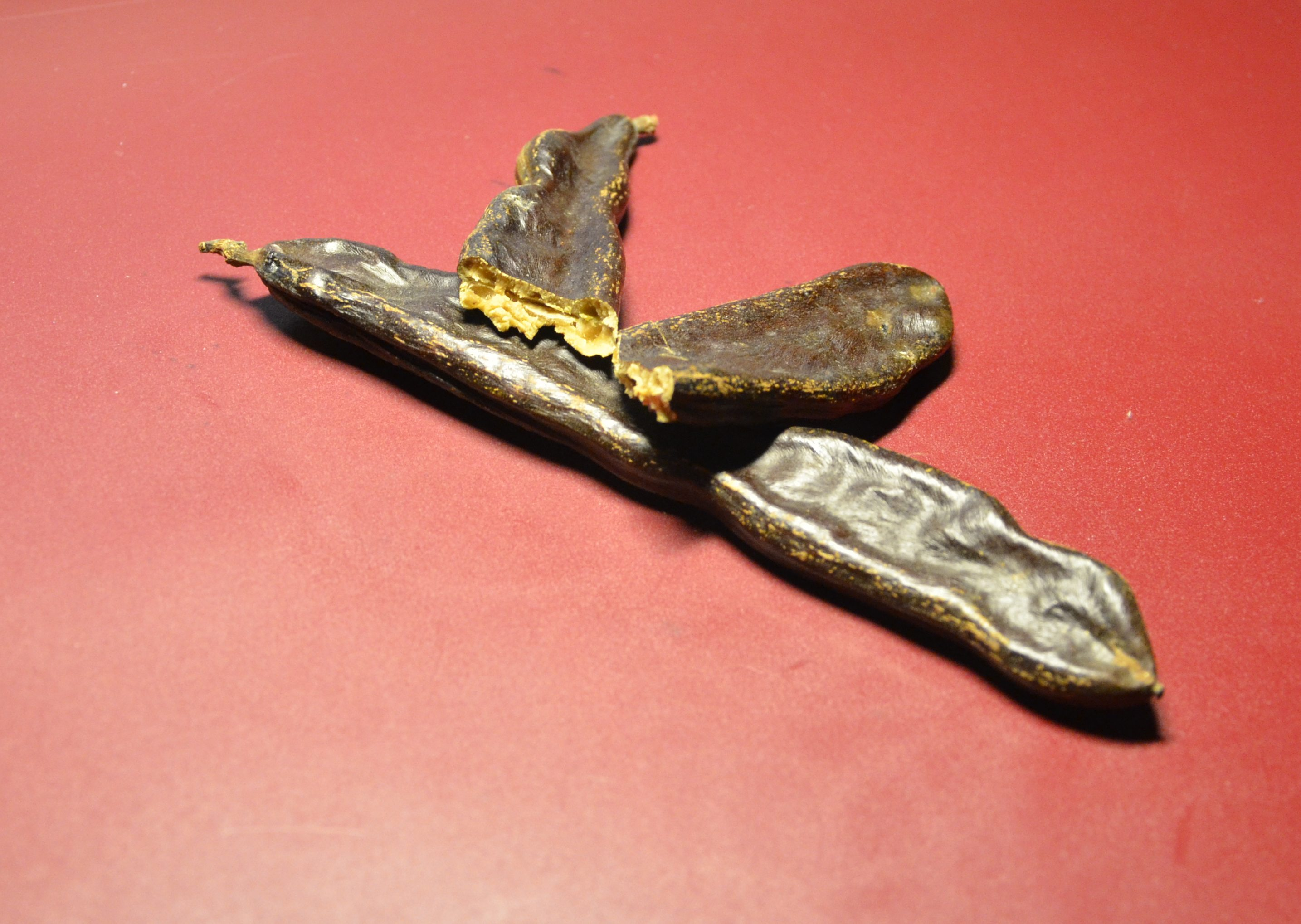
Fruit

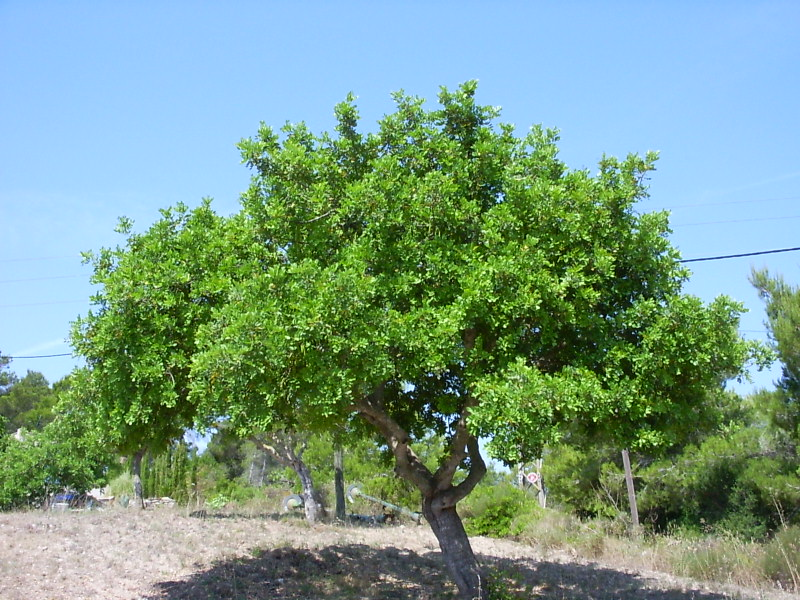
Tree

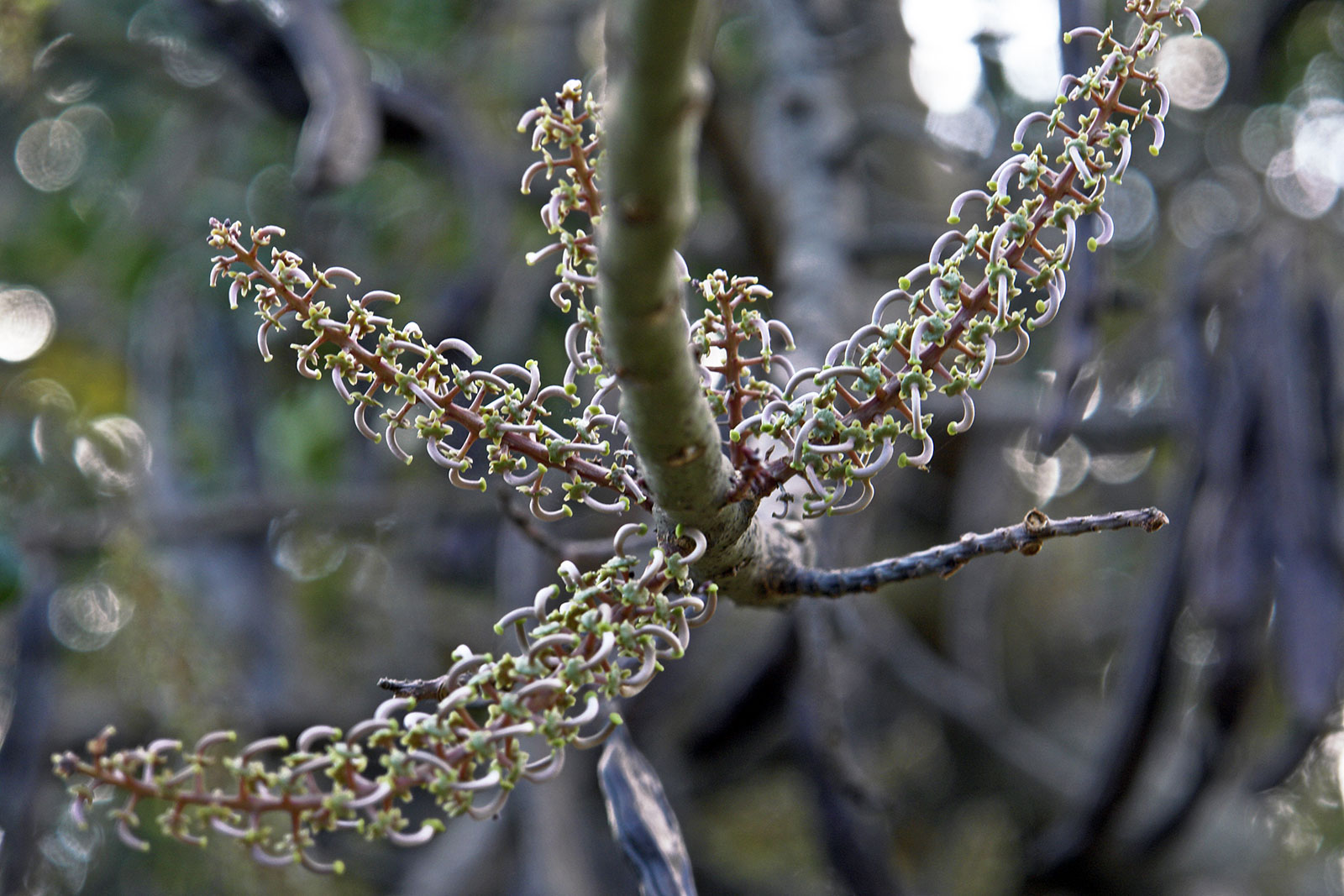
Flowers

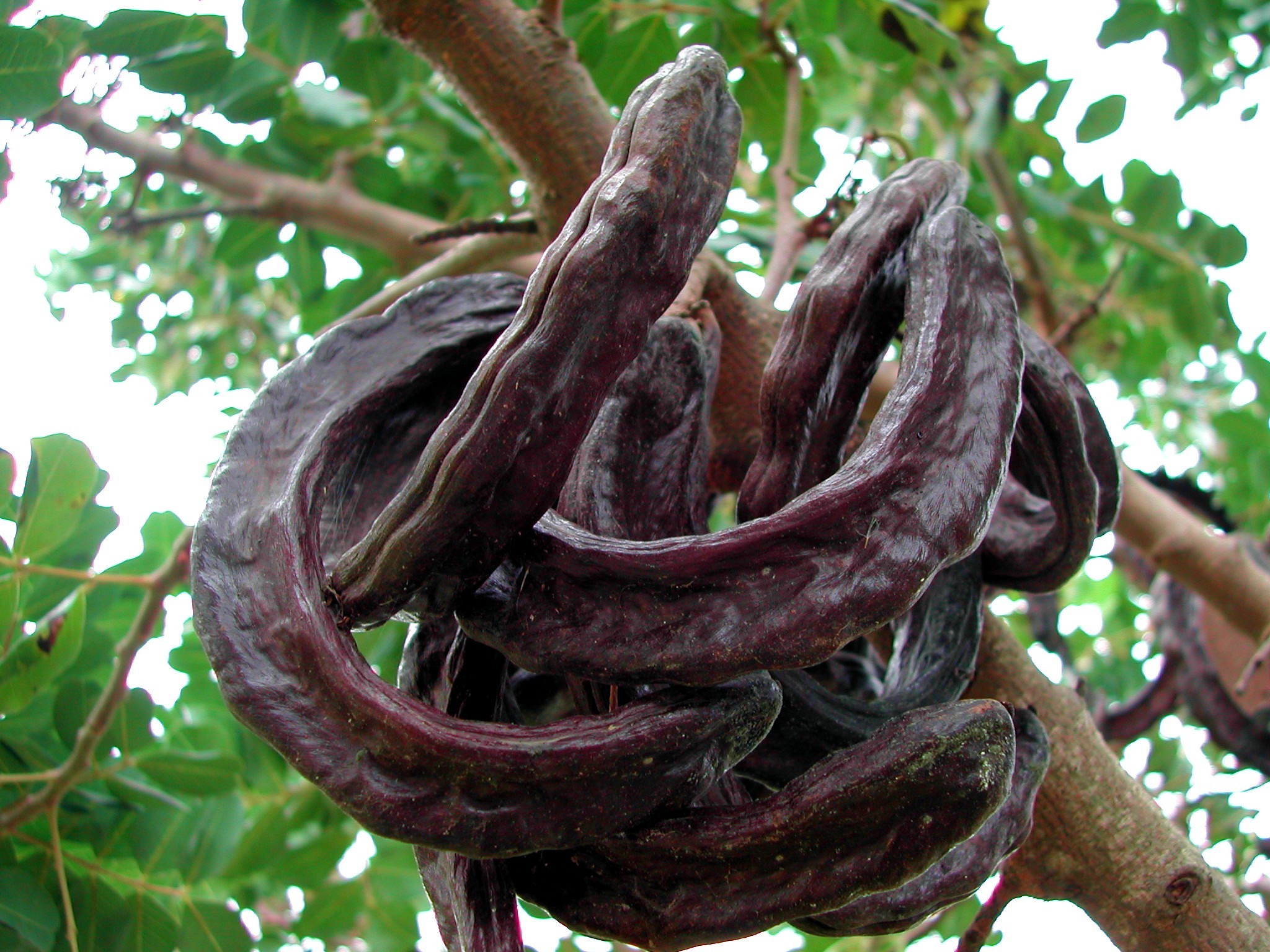
Fruits
