= Zeuzera biebingeri =

Scientific classification
- Kingdom: Animalia
- Phylum: Arthropoda
- Clade: Pancrustacea
- Class: Insecta
- Order: Lepidoptera
- Family: Cossidae
- Genus: Zeuzera
- Species: Z. biebingeri

Binomial name
- Zeuzera biebingeri Speidel et Speidel, 1986

Synonyms
- Zeuzera pyrina bibingeri Lewandowski et Fischer, 2002

Species of moth

Zeuzera biebingeri is a moth in the family Cossidae. It was described by Speidel and Speidel in 1986. It is found on Crete.
