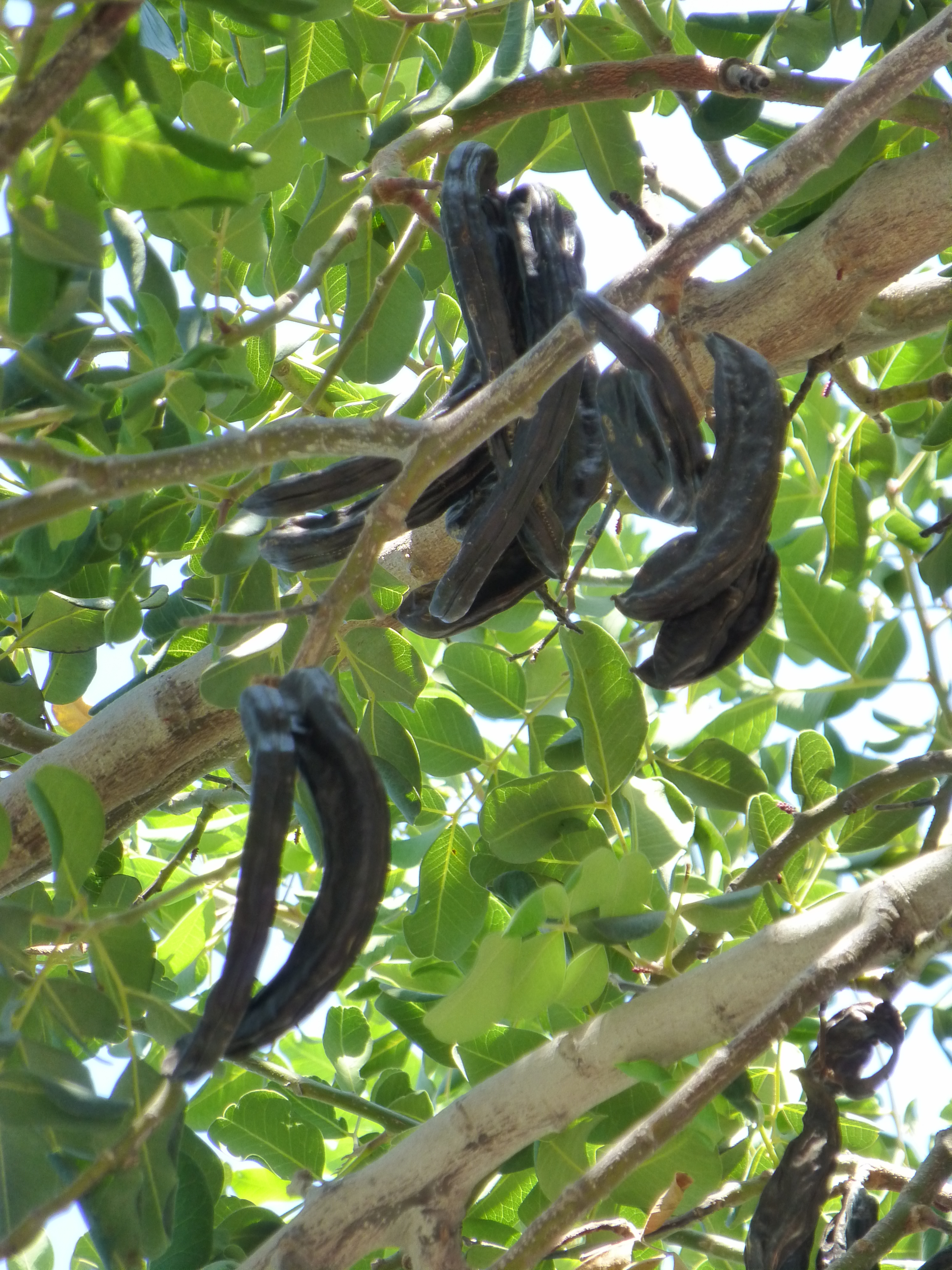
- Carob pods on the tree

Conservation status
- Least Concern (IUCN 3.1)

Scientific classification
- Kingdom: Plantae
- Clade: Tracheophytes
- Clade: Angiosperms
- Clade: Eudicots
- Clade: Rosids
- Order: Fabales
- Family: Fabaceae
- Subfamily: Caesalpinioideae
- Genus: Ceratonia
- Species: C. siliqua

Binomial name
- Ceratonia siliqua L.
- Distribution map ✖ Native range and isolated population incl. as archaeophyte

Synonyms
- Ceratonia coriacea Salisb.; Ceratonia inermis Stokes

= Carob =

Small tree grown for its edible pods and landscaping

The carob (/ˈkærəb/ KARR-əb; Ceratonia siliqua) is a flowering evergreen tree or shrub in the Caesalpinioideae subfamily of the legume family, Fabaceae. The carob tree is native to the Mediterranean region and the Middle East. It is widely cultivated for its edible fruit, which takes the form of seed pods, and as an ornamental tree in gardens and landscapes. Spain is its largest producer, followed by Italy and Morocco.

Carob pods have a number of culinary applications, including a powder or chips that can be used as a chocolate alternative. The seeds are used to produce locust bean gum or carob gum, a common thickening agent used in food processing.

== Description ==
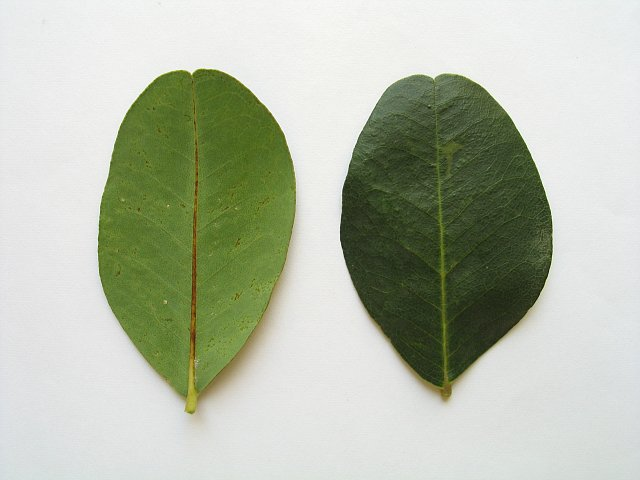
A leaflet of the leaf of the carob tree

The carob tree grows up to 15 metres (50 feet) tall. The crown is broad and semispherical, supported by a thick trunk with rough brown bark and sturdy branches. Its leaves are 10 to 20 centimetres (4 to 8 inches) long, alternate, pinnate, and may or may not have a terminal leaflet. It is frost-tolerant to roughly −7 °C (19 °F).

Most carob trees are dioecious, so strictly male trees do not produce fruit, but some are hermaphroditic. When the trees blossom in autumn, the flowers are small and numerous, spirally arranged along the inflorescence axis in catkin-like racemes borne on spurs from old wood and even on the trunk (cauliflory); they are pollinated by both wind and insects. The male flowers smell like human semen, an odor that is caused in part by amines.

The fruit is a legume (also known commonly, but less accurately, as a pod), that is elongated, compressed, straight, or curved, and thickened at the sutures. The pods take a full year to develop and ripen. When the sweet, ripe pods eventually fall to the ground, they are eaten by various mammals, such as swine, thereby dispersing the hard inner seed in the excrement.

The seeds of the carob tree contain leucodelphinidin, a colourless flavanol precursor related to leucoanthocyanidins.

== Etymology ==
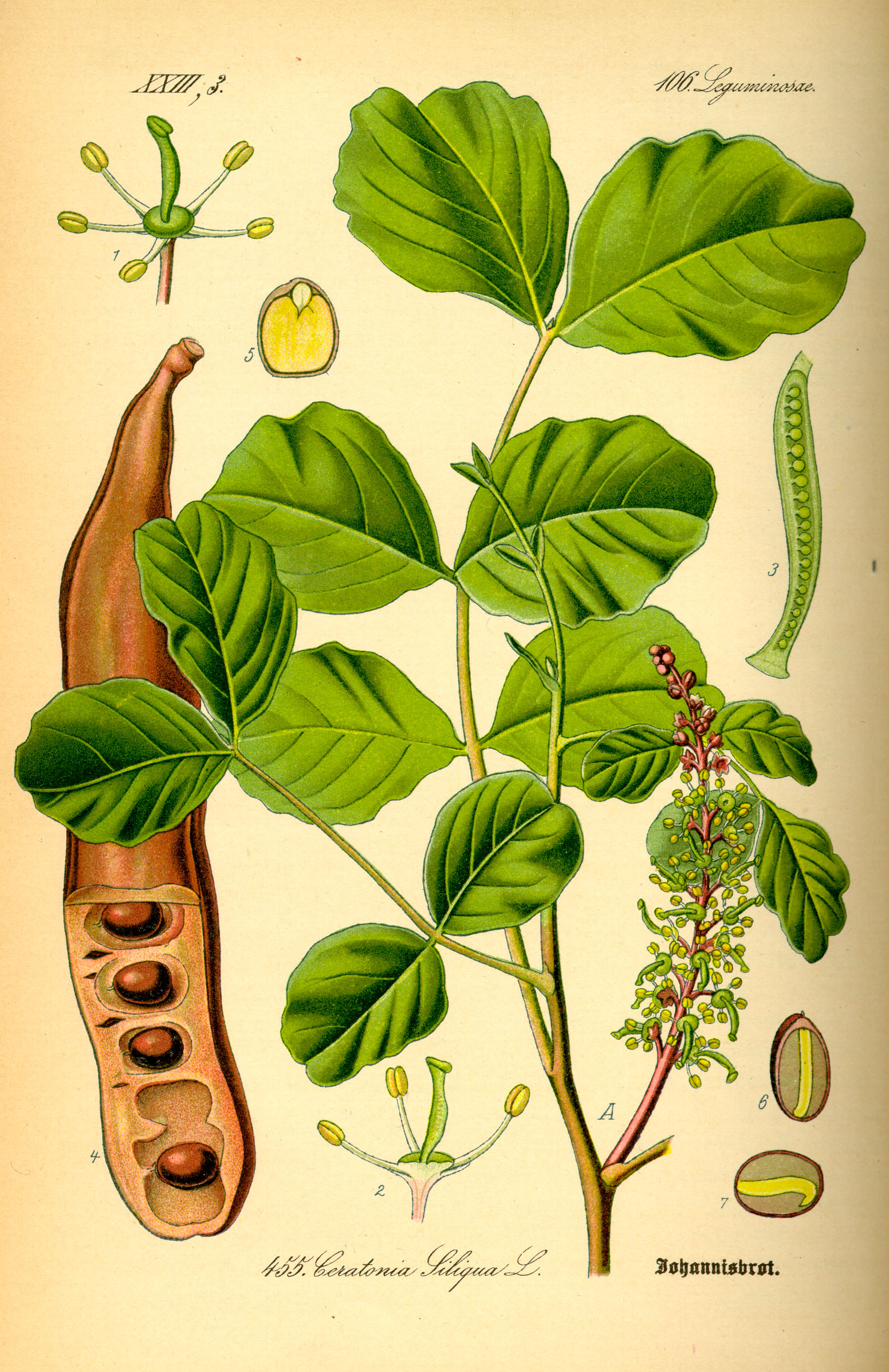
Illustration of Ceratonia siliqua

The word "carob" comes from Middle French carobe (modern French caroube), which borrowed it from Arabic خَرُّوبٌ (kharrūb, "locust bean pod"), Persian خرنوب (khirnub) and Hebrew חָרוּב (ḥaruv), which ultimately borrowed it perhaps from Akkadian language harūb- or Aramaic ḥarrūḇā.

Ceratonia siliqua, the scientific name of the carob tree, derives from the Greek κερατωνία keratōnía, "carob-tree" (cf. κέρας kéras, "horn"), and Latin siliqua "pod, carob".

In English, it is also known as "St. John's bread" (Note: From the belief that the seeds and pulp were the "locusts" and "honey" eaten by John the Baptist) and "locust tree" (not to be confused with African locust bean). The latter designation also applies to several other trees from the same family.

In Yiddish, it is called באקסער bokser, derived from the Middle High German bokshornboum "ram's horn tree" (in reference to the shape of the carob).

The carat, a unit of mass for gemstones, and a measurement of purity for gold, takes its name via the Arabic qīrāṭ from the Greek name for the carob seed κεράτιον (lit. "small horn").

== Distribution and habitat ==
The carob tree is native to the Mediterranean region and the Middle East. Although cultivated extensively, carob can still be found growing wild in eastern Mediterranean regions, and has become naturalized in the western Mediterranean.

The tree is typical in the southern Portugal region of the Algarve, where the tree is called alfarrobeira, and the fruit alfarroba. It is also seen in southern and eastern Spain (Spanish: algarrobo, algarroba, Catalan / Valencian / Balearic: garrofer, garrofera, garrover, garrovera), mainly in the regions of Andalusia, Murcia, Valencia, the Balearic Islands and Catalonia (Catalan / Valencian / Balearic: garrofer, garrofera, garrover, garrovera); Malta (Maltese: ħarruba), on the Italian islands of Sicily (Sicilian: carrua) and Sardinia (Sardinian: carrubba, carruba), in southern Croatia (Croatian: rogač), such as on the island of Šipan, in eastern Bulgaria (Bulgarian: рожков) and in southern Greece, Cyprus, as well as on many Greek islands such as Crete and Samos. The common Greek name is χαρουπιά (translit. charoupiá), or ξυλοκερατιά (translit. xylokeratiá, meaning "wooden horn"). In Turkey, it is known as "goat's horn" (Turkish: keçiboynuzu). In Israel, the Hebrew name is חרוב (translit. kharúv).

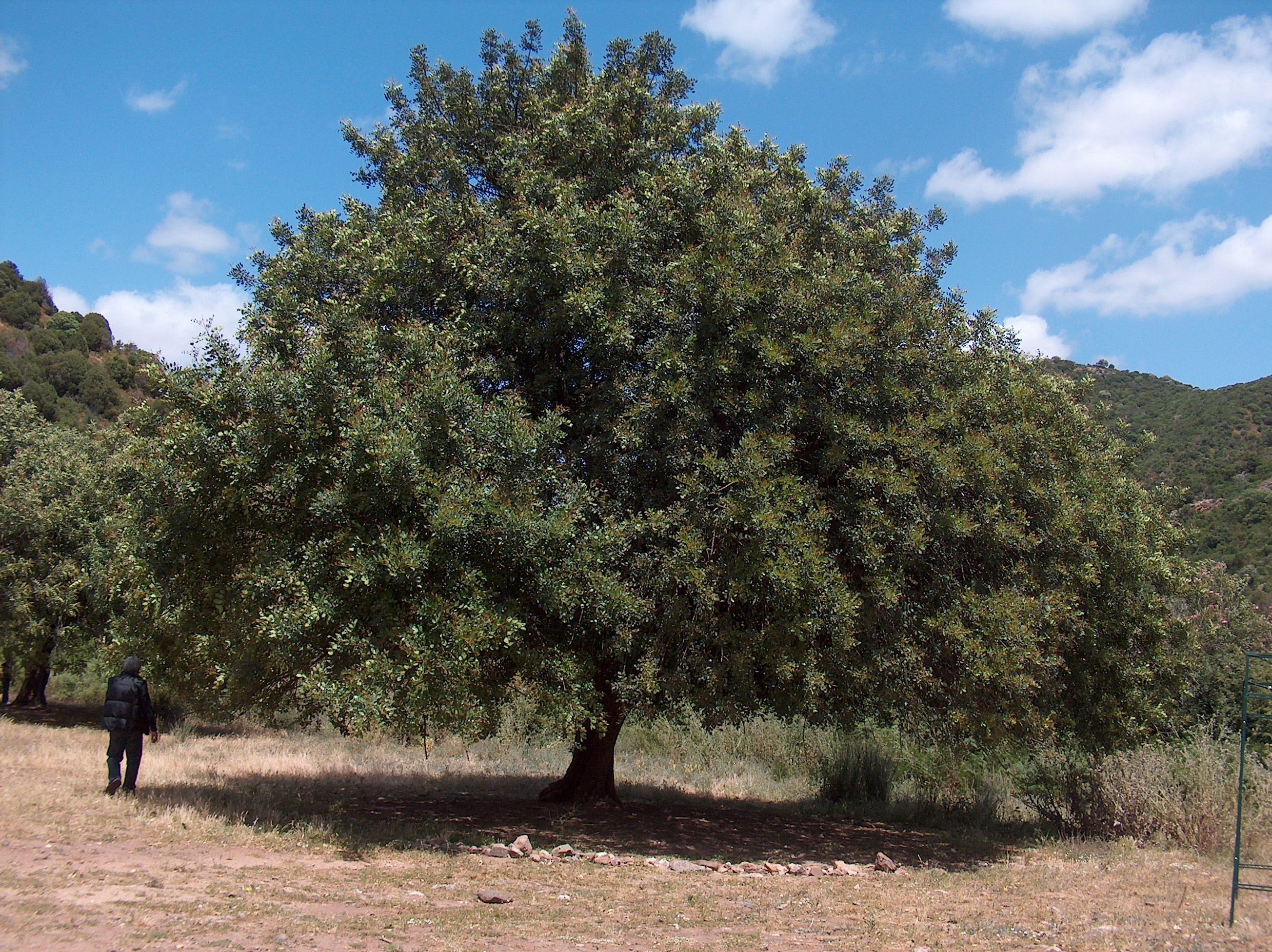
A large carob tree in Sardinia

The various trees known as algarrobo in Latin America (Samanea saman in Cuba, Prosopis pallida in Peru, and four species of Prosopis in Argentina and Paraguay) belong to a different subfamily of the Fabaceae: Mimosoideae. Early Spanish settlers named them algarrobo after the carob tree because they also produce pods with sweet pulp.

== Ecology ==
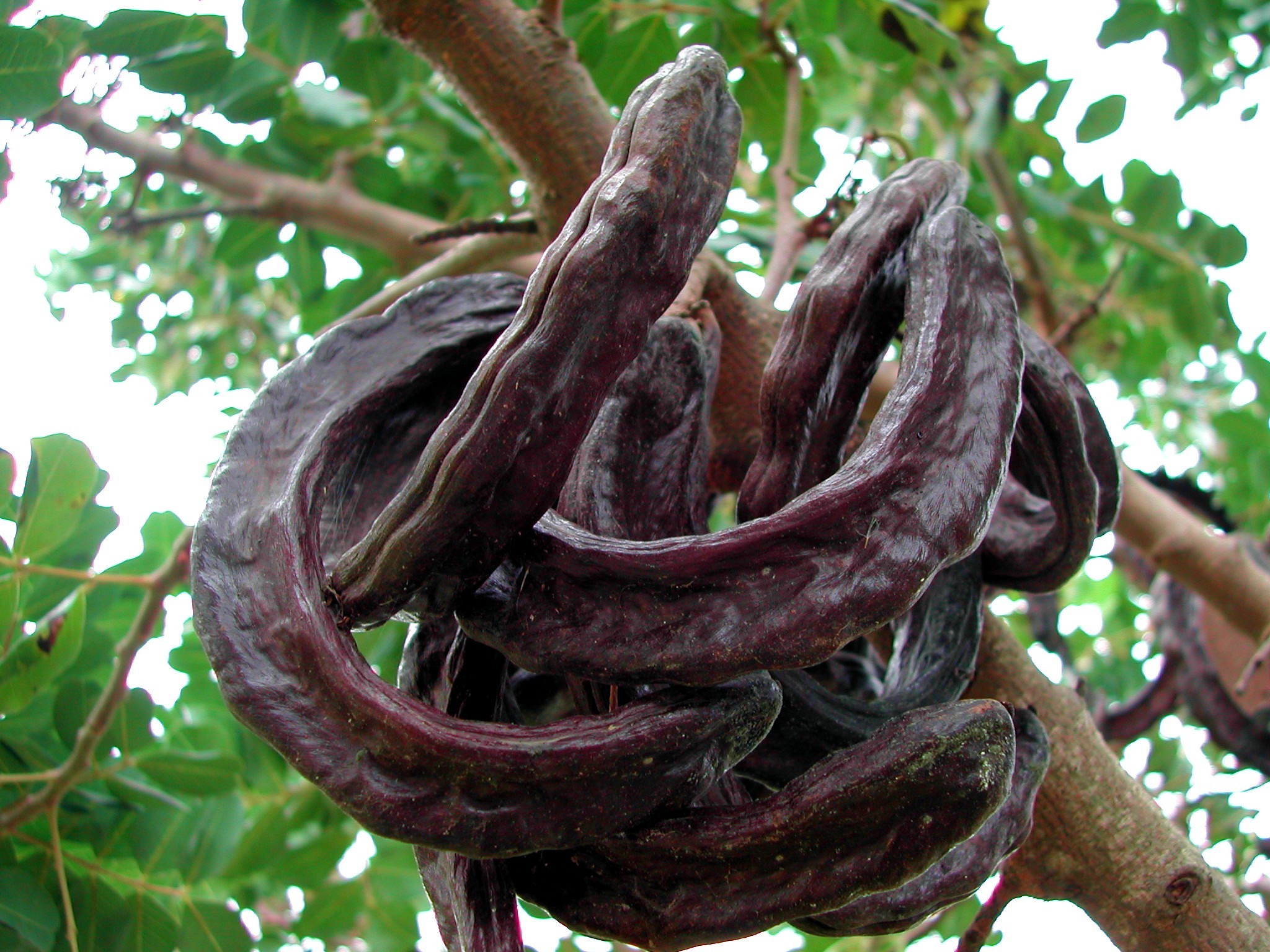
Ripe carob fruit pods on the tree

The carob genus, Ceratonia, belongs to the legume family, Fabaceae, and is believed to be an archaic remnant of a part of this family now generally considered extinct. It grows well in warm temperate and subtropical areas, and tolerates hot and humid coastal areas. As a xerophyte (drought-resistant species), carob is well adapted to the conditions of the Mediterranean region with just 250 to 500 millimetres (10 to 20 in) of rainfall per year.

Carob trees can survive long periods of drought, but in order to grow fruit they need 500 to 550 millimetres (20 to 22 in) of rainfall per year. They prefer well-drained, sandy loams and are intolerant of waterlogging, but the deep root systems can adapt to a wide variety of soil conditions and are fairly salt-tolerant (up to 3% in soil). After being irrigated with saline water in the summer, carob trees could possibly recover during winter rainfalls. In some experiments, young carob trees were capable of basic physiological functions under high-salt conditions (40 mmol NaCl/L).

Not all legume species can develop a symbiotic relationship with rhizobia to make use of atmospheric nitrogen. It remains unclear whether carob trees have this ability; some findings suggest that it is not able to form root nodules with rhizobia, while in another more recent study, trees have been identified with nodules containing bacteria believed to be from the genus Rhizobium. However, a study measuring the ^{15}N-signal (isotopic signature) in the tissue of the carob tree did not support the theory that carob trees naturally use atmospheric nitrogen.

== Cultivation ==
The vegetative propagation of carob is naturally restricted due to its low adventitious rooting potential. Therefore, grafting and air-layering may prove to be more effective methods of asexual propagation. Seeds are commonly used as the propagation medium. The sowing occurs in pot nurseries in early spring and the cooling- and drying-sensitive seedlings are then transplanted to the field in the next year after the last frost. Carob trees enter slowly into production phase. Where in areas with favorable growing conditions, the cropping starts 3–4 years after budding, with the nonbearing period requiring up to 8 years in regions with marginal soils. Full bearing of the trees occurs mostly at a tree-age of 20–25 years when the yield stabilizes. The orchards are traditionally planted in low densities of 25–45 trees per hectare (10 to 20/acre). Hermaphroditic or male trees, which produce fewer or no pods, respectively, are usually planted in lower densities in the orchards as pollenizers.

Intercropping with other tree species is widely spread. Not much cultivation management is required. Only light pruning and occasional tilling to reduce weeds is necessary. Nitrogen-fertilizing of the plants has been shown to have positive impacts on yield performance. Although it is native to moderately dry climates, two or three summers' irrigation greatly aid the development, hasten the fruiting, and increase the yield of a carob tree.

=== Harvest and post-harvest treatment ===
The most labour-intensive part of carob cultivation is harvesting, which is often done by knocking the fruit down with a long stick and gathering them together with the help of laid-out nets. This is a delicate task because the trees are flowering at the same time and care has to be taken not to damage the flowers and the next year's crop. The literature recommends research to get the fruit to ripen more uniformly or also for cultivars which can be mechanically harvested (by shaking).

Freshly harvested carob pods have a moisture content of 10–20% and should be dried down to a moisture content of 8% so they do not rot. Further processing separates the kernels (seeds) from the pulp. This process is called kibbling and results in seeds and pieces of carob pods (kibbles). Processing of the pulp includes grinding for animal feed production or roasting and milling for human food industry. The seeds have to be peeled which happens with acid or through roasting. The endosperm and the embryo are then separated for different uses.

=== Pests and diseases ===
Few pests cause severe damage in carob orchards, so they have traditionally not been treated with pesticides. Some generalist pests such as the larvae of the leopard moth (Zeuzera pyrina), the dried fruit moth (Cadra calidella), small rodents such as rats (Rattus spp.) and gophers (Pitymys spp.) can occasionally cause damage in some regions. Only some cultivars are severely susceptible to mildew disease (Pseudoidium ceratoniae). One pest directly associated with carob is the larva of the carob moth (Myelois ceratoniae), which can cause extensive post-harvest damage.

Cadra calidella both attacks carob crops before harvest and infests products in stores. This moth, prevalent in Cyprus, will often infest the country's carob stores. Research has been conducted to understand the physiology of the moth, in order to gain insight on how to monitor moth reproduction and lower their survival rates, such as through temperature control, pheromone traps, or parasitoid traps.

=== Production ===
In 2022, world production of carob (as locust beans) was estimated to be 56,423 tonnes, although not all countries known to grow carob reported their results to the UN Food and Agriculture Organization. Production amounts for Turkey and Morocco accounted for nearly all the world total reported in 2022.

Most of the roughly 50 known cultivars are of unknown origin and only regionally distributed. The cultivars show high genetic and therefore morphological and agronomical variation. No conventional breeding by controlled crossing has been reported, but selection from orchards or wild populations has been done. Domesticated carobs (C. s. var. edulis) can be distinguished from their wild relatives (C. s. var. silvestris) by some fruit-yielding traits such as building of greater beans, more pulp, and higher sugar contents. Also, genetic adaptation of some varieties to the climatic requirements of their growing regions has occurred. Though a partially successful breaking of the dioecy happened, the yield of hermaphrodite trees still cannot compete with that of female plants, as their pod-bearing properties are worse. Future breeding would be focused on processing-quality aspects, as well as on properties for better mechanization of harvest or better-yielding hermaphroditic plants. The use of modern breeding techniques is restricted due to low polymorphism for molecular markers.

== Uses ==
=== Food ===
Carob sweets

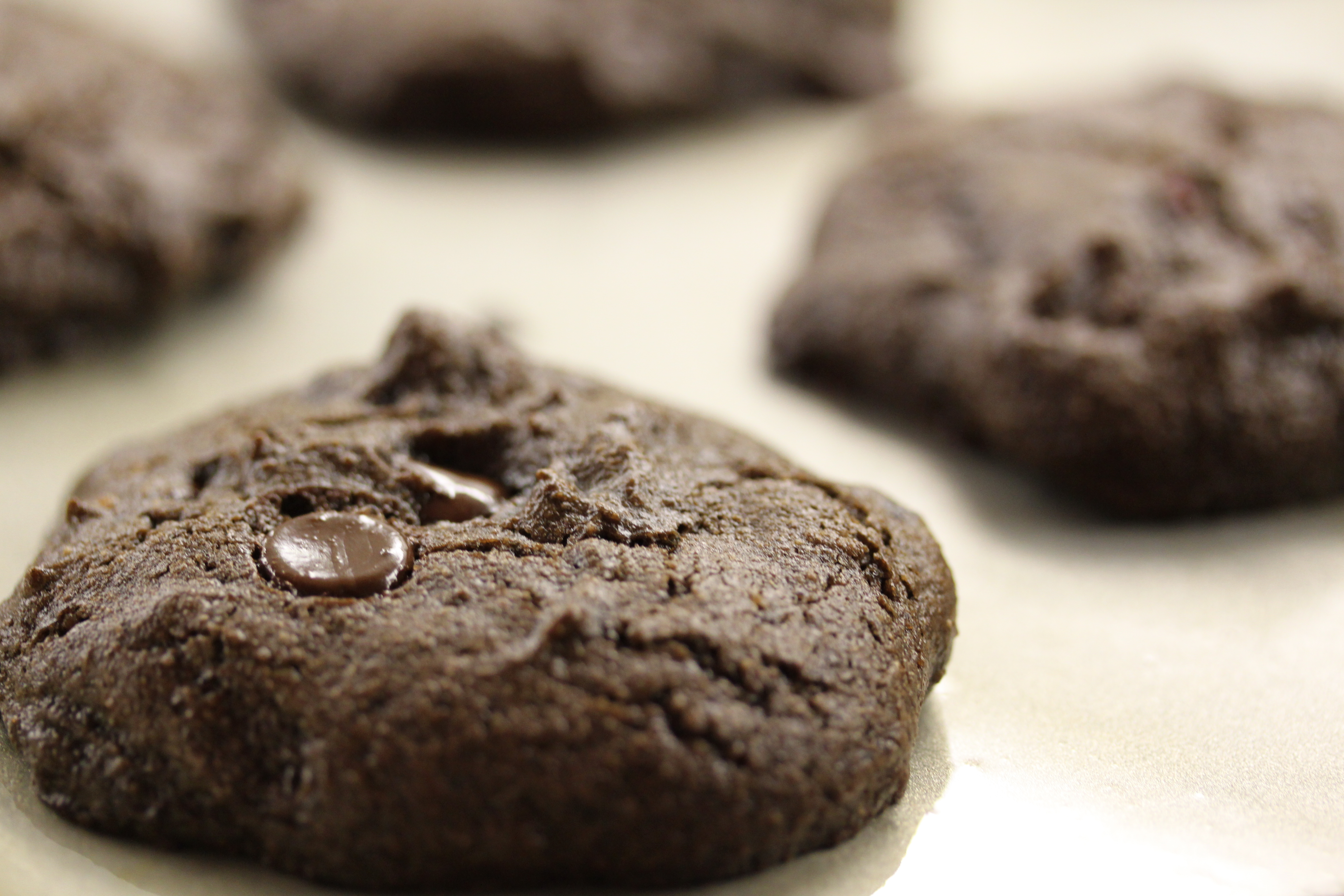
Carob cookies with carob chips are similar to chocolate chip cookies.

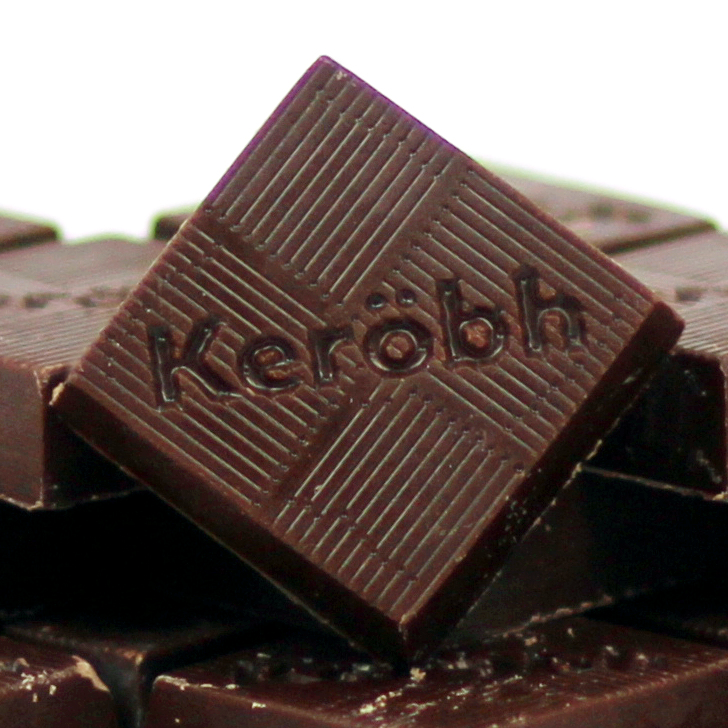
Carob candy that looks like chocolate

Carob products consumed by humans come from the dried (and sometimes roasted) pod, which has two main parts: the pulp accounts for 90% and the seeds 10% by weight. Carob pulp is sold either as flour or "chunks". The flour of the carob embryo (seed) can also be used for human and animal nutrition, but the seed is often separated before making carob powder.

Carob pods are mildly sweet on their own (being roughly one third to one half sugar by dry weight), so they are used in powdered, chip or syrup form as an ingredient in cakes and cookies, sometimes as a substitute for chocolate in recipes because of the color, texture, and taste of carob. In Malta, a traditional sweet called karamelli tal-harrub and eaten during the Christian holy days of Lent and Good Friday is made from carob pods. Dried carob fruit is traditionally eaten on the Jewish holiday of Tu Bishvat.

Carob pods were used as famine food in the Mediterranean Basin, including the southern Atlantic coast of Portugal and the Atlantic northwestern Moroccan coast. In rabbinic literature, carob was regarded as a low-status food. One source advises that in times of scarcity, even a single kab of carobs should not be hoarded. Other rabbinic texts refer to carob as suitable for animal feed.

==== Carob powder ====
Carob powder (carob pulp flour) is made of dried or roasted, then finely ground, carob pod pulp. Carob powder can be used as a substitute for cocoa powder, which often occurred during the 1970s natural food movement.

==== Locust bean gum ====
Locust bean gum is produced from the endosperm, which accounts for 42–46% of the carob seed, and is rich in galactomannans (88% of endosperm dry mass). Galactomannans are hydrophilic and swell in water. If galactomannans are mixed with other gelling substances, such as carrageenan, they can be used to effectively thicken the liquid part of food. This is used extensively in canned food for animals in order to get the "jellied" texture.

==== Animal feed ====
While chocolate contains the chemical compound theobromine in levels that are toxic to some mammals, carob contains none, and it also has no caffeine, so it is sometimes used to make chocolate-like treats for dogs. Carob pod meal is also used as an energy-rich feed for livestock, particularly for ruminants, though its high tannin content may limit this use.

Carob pods were used as animal feed in the Mediterranean Basin. They were mainly used for animal fodder in the Maltese islands, apart from times of famine or war, when they formed part of the diet of many Maltese people. On the Iberian Peninsula, carob pods were historically fed to donkeys.

==== Composition ====
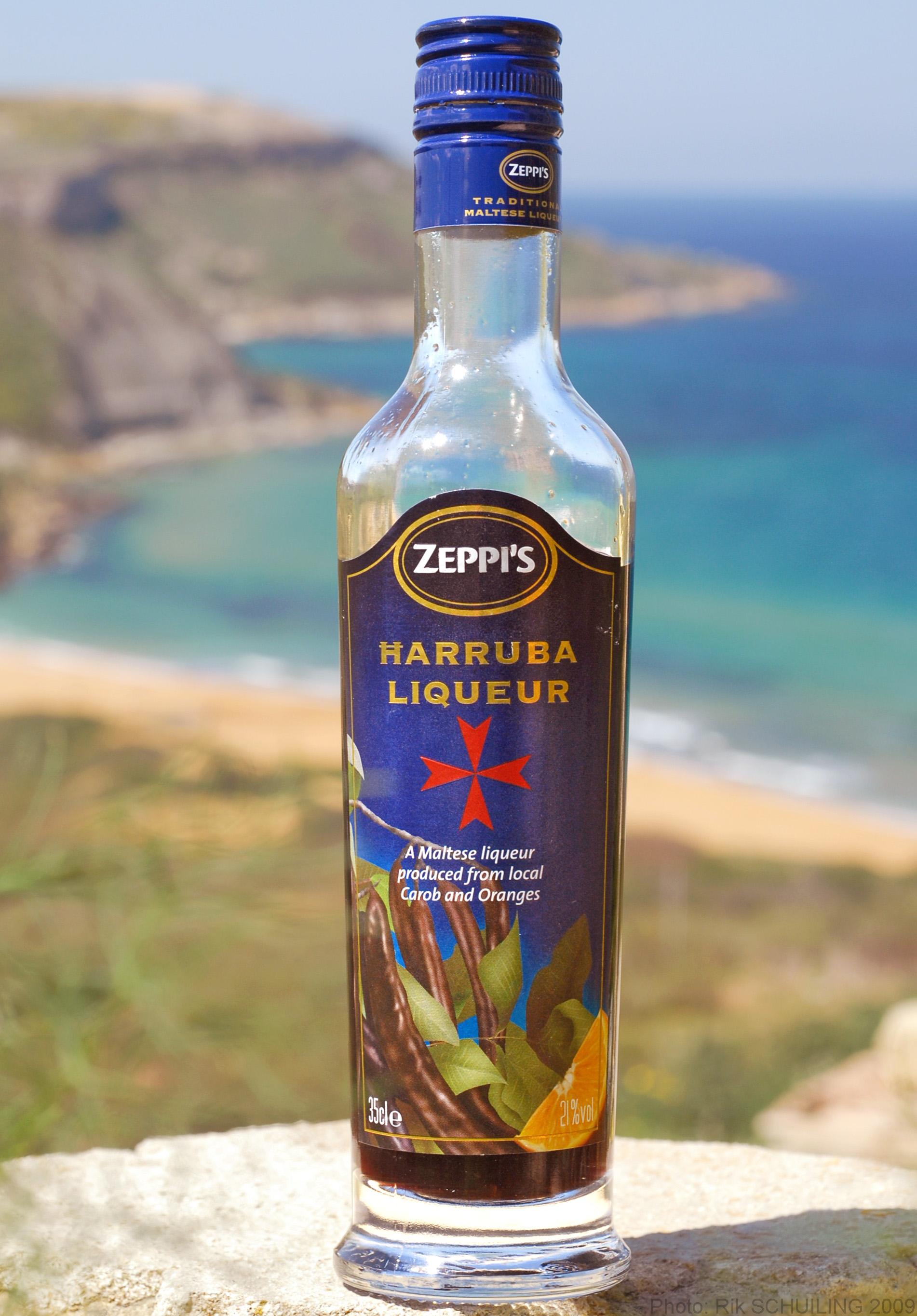
Maltese carob liqueur

The pulp of a carob pod is about 48–56% sugars and 18% cellulose and hemicellulose. Some differences in sugar (sucrose) content are seen between wild and cultivated carob trees: ~531 g/kg dry weight in cultivated varieties and ~437 g/kg in wild varieties. Fructose and glucose levels do not differ between cultivated and wild carob. The embryo (20–25% of seed weight) is rich in proteins (50%). The testa, or seed coat (30–33% of seed weight), contains cellulose, lignins, and tannins.

=== Syrup and drinks ===
Carob pods are about a third to a half sugar by weight, and this sugar can be extracted into a syrup. In Malta, a carob syrup (ġulepp tal-ħarrub) is made out of the pods. Carob syrup is also used in Crete, and Cyprus exports it.

In Egypt and the Levant, crushed carob pods are heated to caramelize their natural sugars, producing carob molasses. Water and brown sugar are then added to the mixture and boiled for a period of time. The resulting beverage, served cold and known as "kharrub" or "kharoub," is particularly popular during the month of Ramadan. This drink is widely sold by juice shops and street vendors and holds cultural significance in both the Levant and Egypt.

In Lebanon the molasses is called debs el kharrub (literally: molasses of the carob), but people generally shorten it to debs. The molasses has a sweet, chocolate-like flavor. It is commonly mixed with tahini (typically 75% kharrub molasses and 25% tahini). The resulting mixture is called debs bi tahini and is eaten raw or with bread. The molasses is also used in certain cakes. The region of Iqlim al-Kharrub, which translates to the region of the carob, produces a significant amount of carob.

In Cyprus, the dried and milled carob pods are left to soak in water, before being transferred into special containers out of which the carob juice gradually seeps and is collected. The juice is then boiled with constant stirring yielding a thick syrup known as haroupomelo. Although this syrup is frequently sold and eaten as is, haroupomelo is also used as a base for a local toffee-like sweet snack known as pasteli. Constant stirring of the carob syrup causes it to form into a black, amorphous mass which is then left to cool. The mass is then kneaded, stretched and pulled until the fair, golden color and toffee-like texture of pasteli is obtained.

=== Ornamental ===
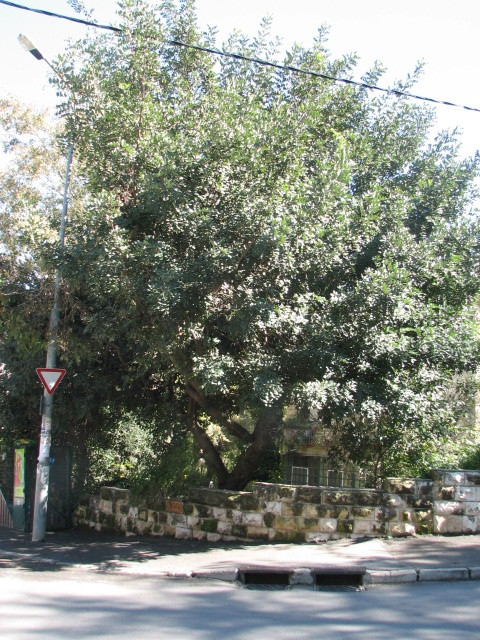
Carob tree in Jerusalem

The carob tree is widely cultivated in the horticultural nursery industry as an ornamental plant for Mediterranean climates and other temperate regions around the world, being especially popular in California and Hawaii. The plant develops a sculpted trunk and the form of an ornamental tree after being "limbed up" as it matures, otherwise it is used as a dense and large screening hedge. The plant is very drought tolerant as long as one does not care about the size of the fruit harvest, so can be used in xeriscape landscape design for gardens, parks, and public municipal and commercial landscapes.

=== Timber ===
In some areas of Greece, viz. Crete, carob wood is often used as firewood. As it makes such excellent fuel, it is sometimes even preferred over oak or olive wood.

Because the much fluted stem usually shows heart rot, carob wood is rarely used for construction timber. However, it is sometimes sought for ornamental work—particularly for furniture design, as the natural shape of the trunk is well-suited to the task. Additionally, the extremely wavy grain of the wood gives carob wood exceptional resistance to splitting; thus, sections of Carob bole are suitable for chopping blocks for splitting wood.

=== In culture ===
In parts of the Levant, it was considered a tree of misfortune, associated with the planet Saturn, known for its dryness and difficult labor, since unlike most trees, it could survive on stony mountainsides. As such, it became a food choice during famine and drought in certain locations, such as Italy, Morocco, Cyprus, and Spain. Since then, the tree became regarded as a symbol of the authentic Mediterranean landscape in an era of global warming.

== Gallery ==
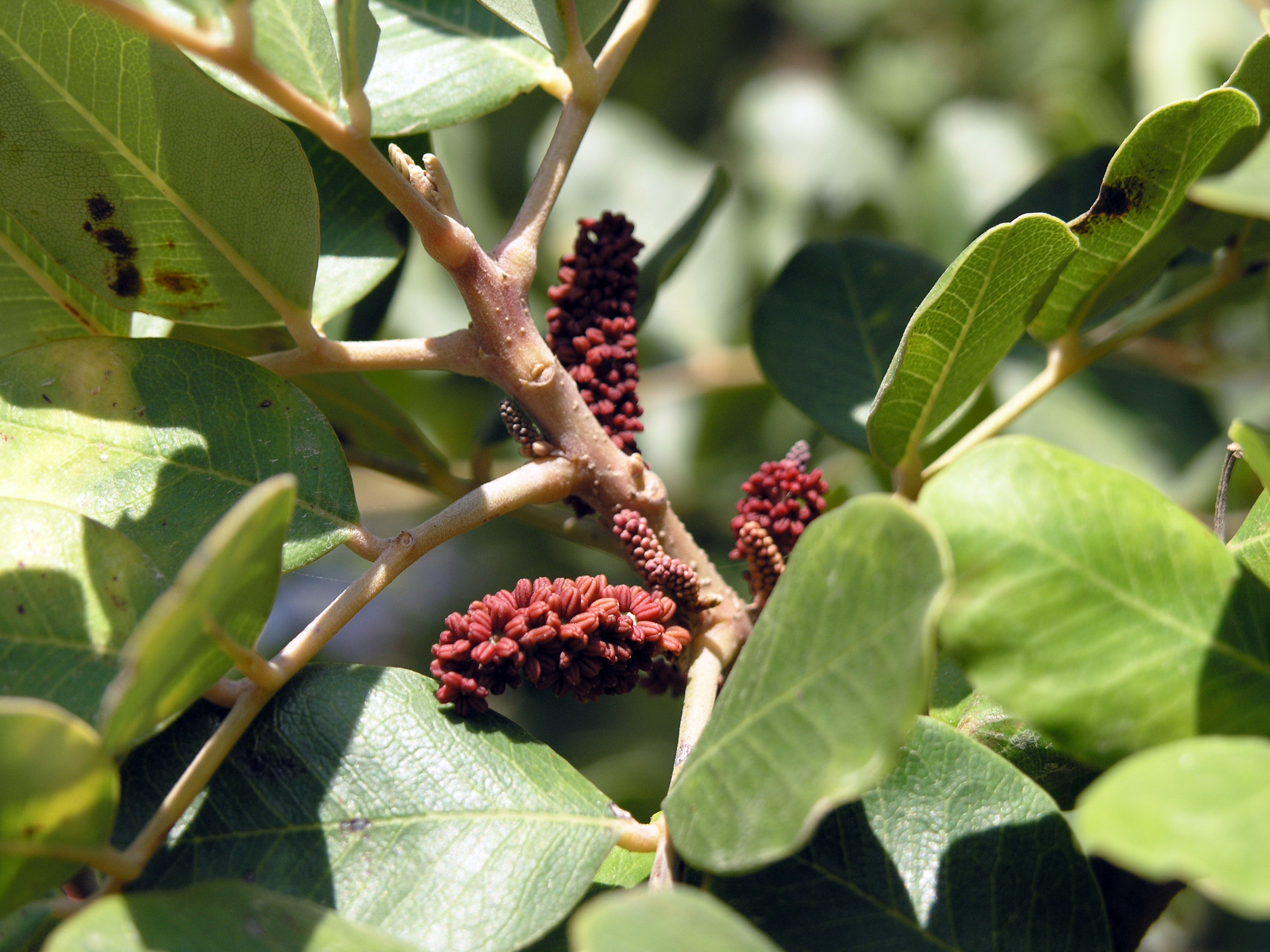
Male flowers on a carob tree in Cyprus, which emanate a strong cadaverine odor

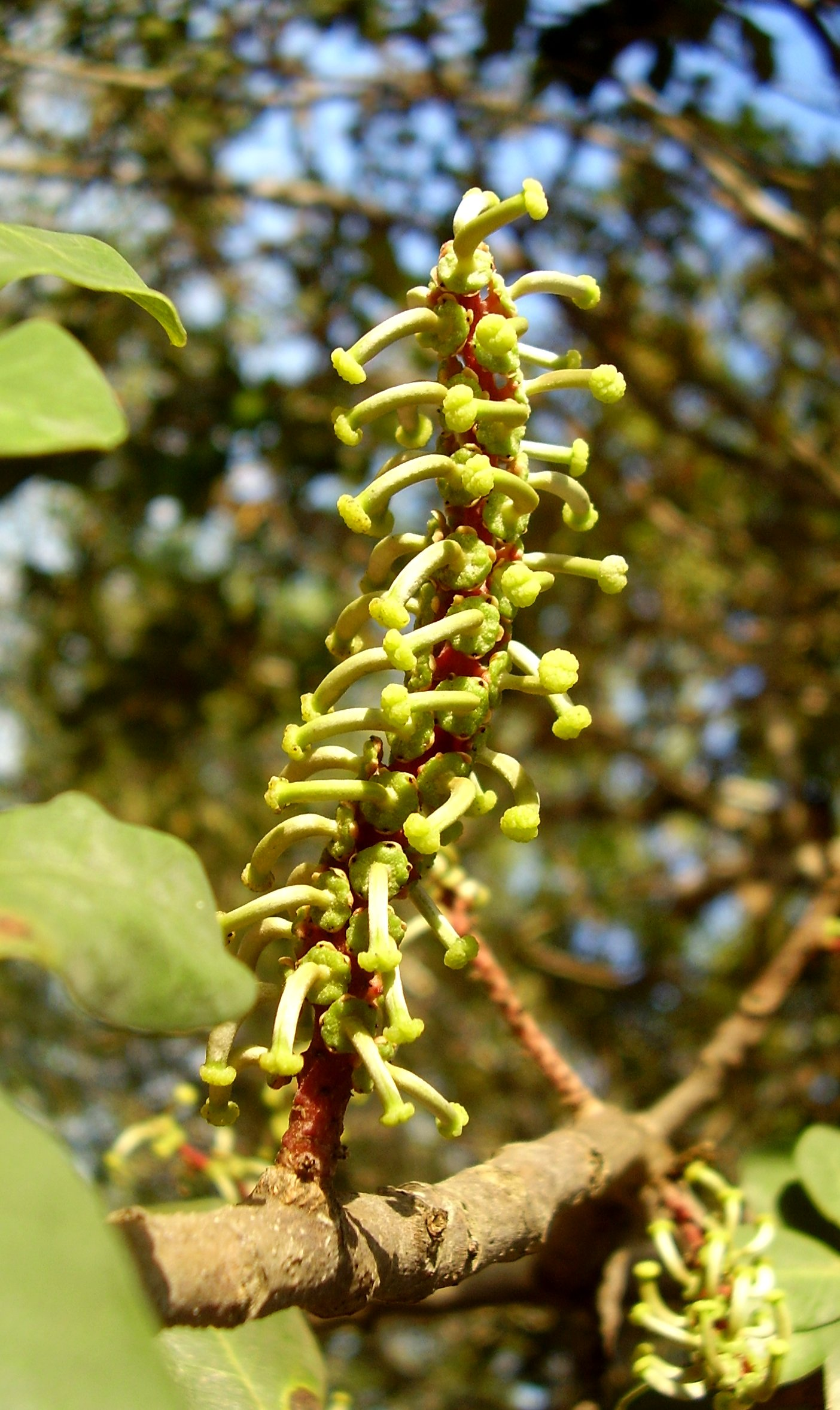
Close-up of female flowers on the carob tree

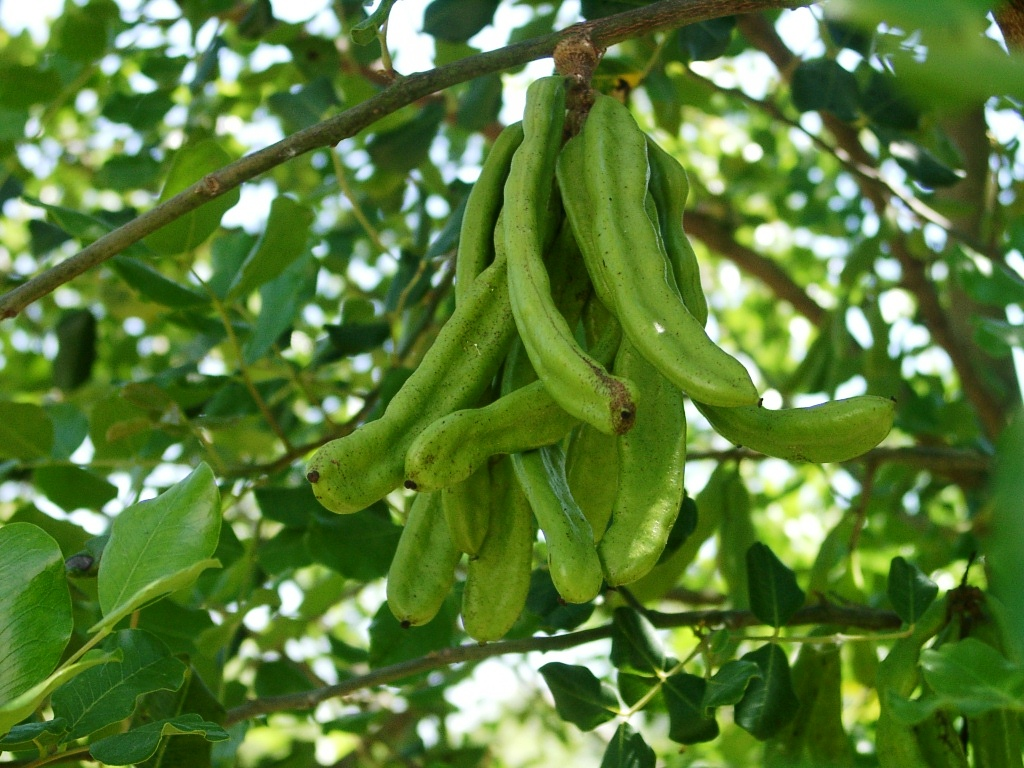
Green carob fruit pods on tree, 15 cm (6 in) long

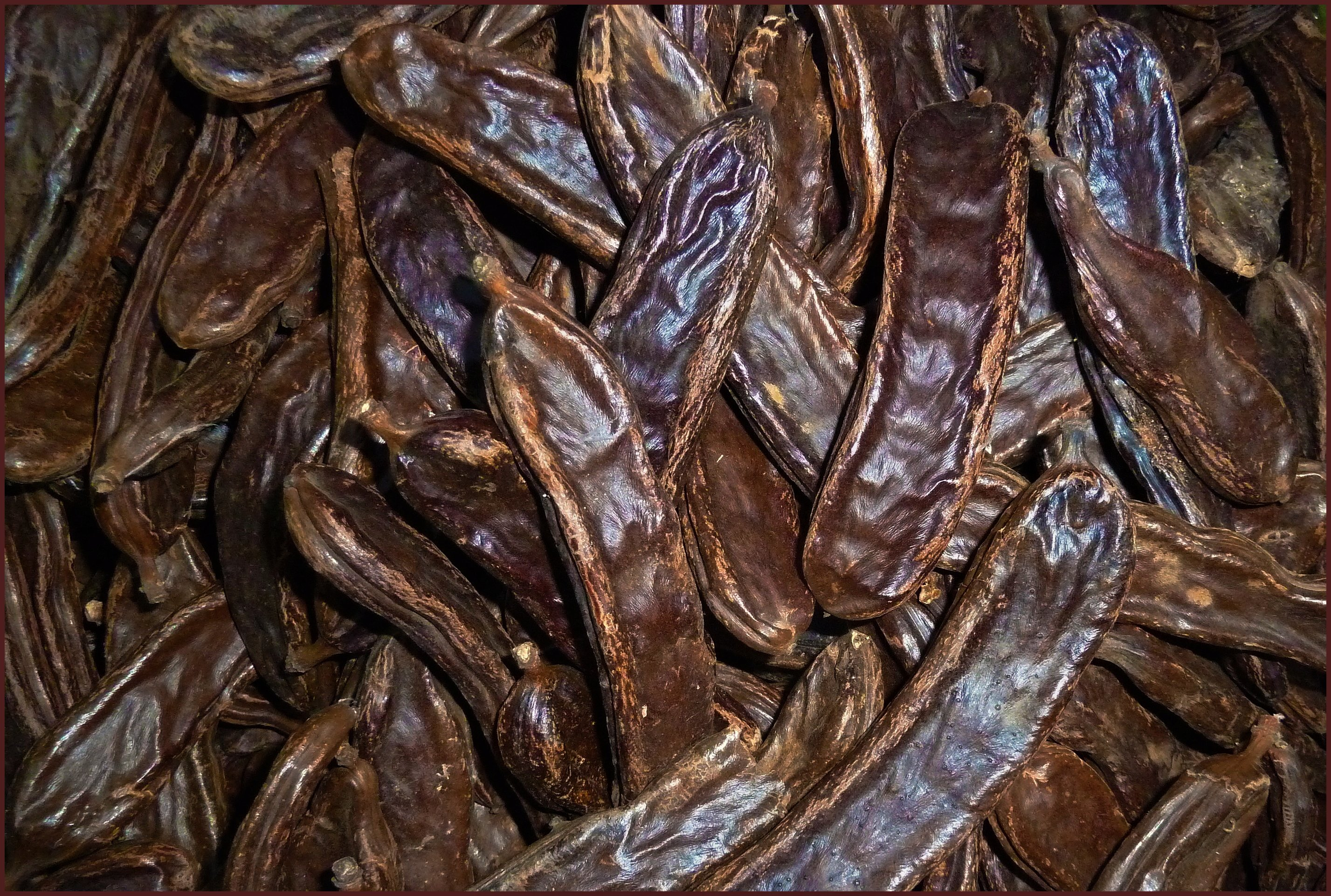
Fruit of the carob tree

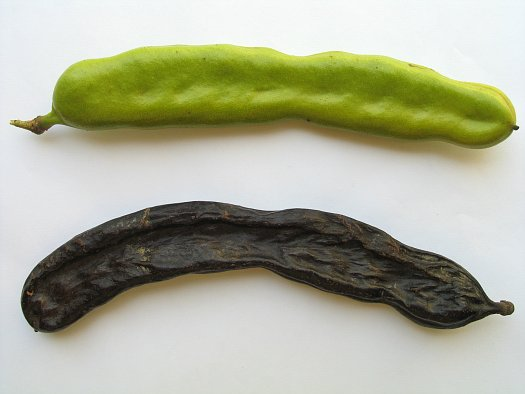
Carob pods: green (unripe) and brown (ripe)

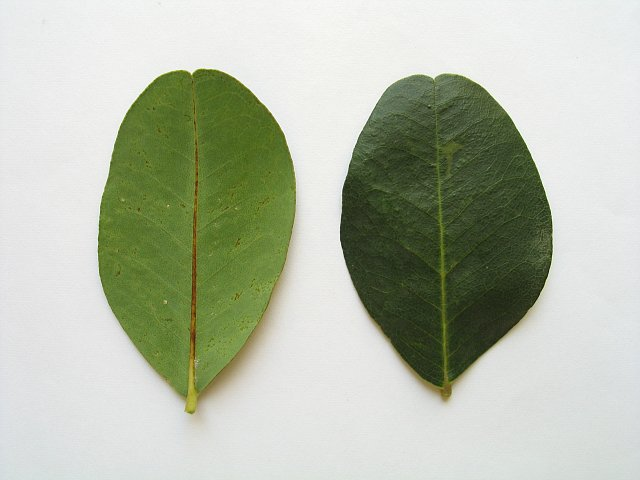
Abaxial and adaxial surfaces of a leaflet from the carob tree

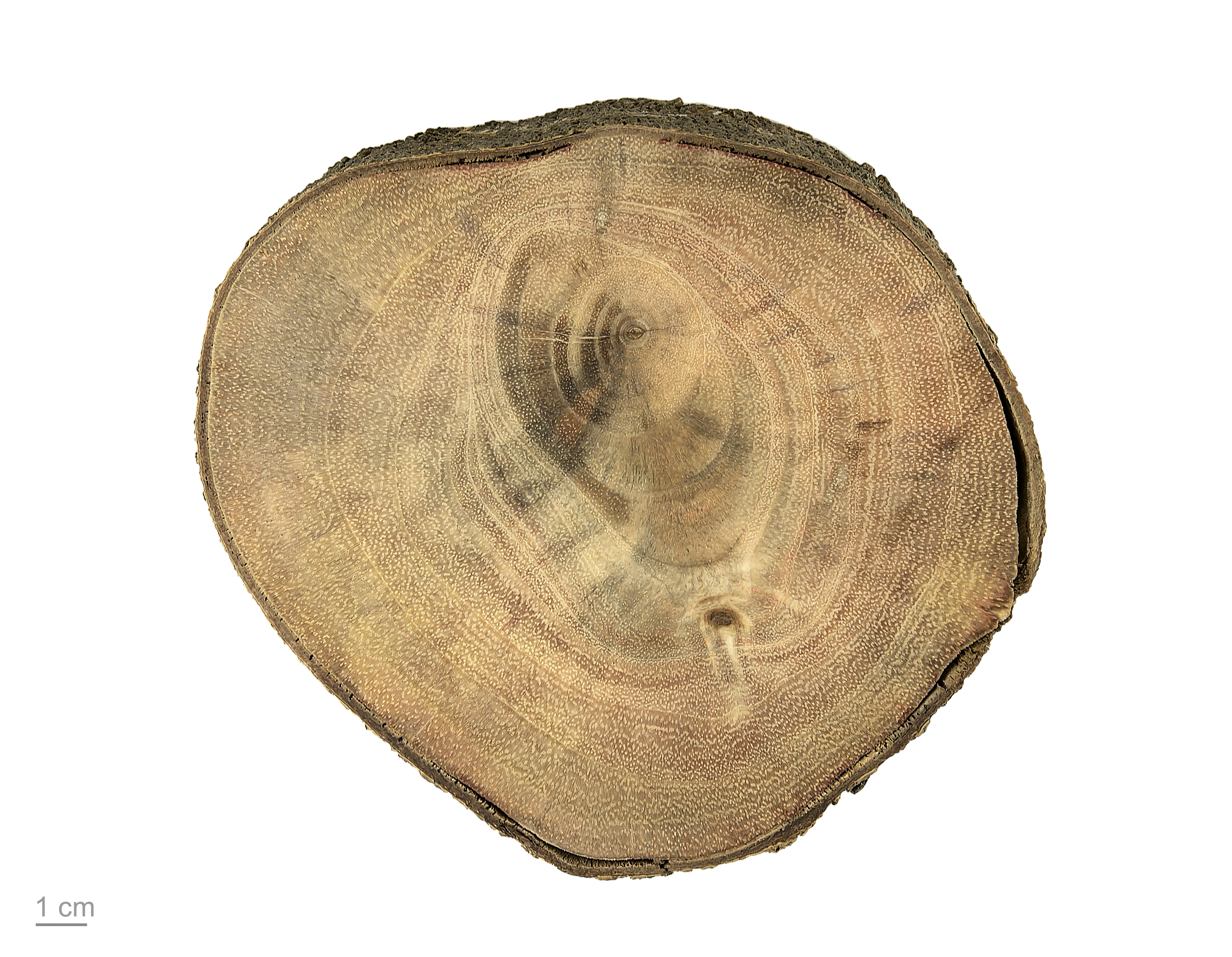
Ceratonia siliqua wood – Museum specimen

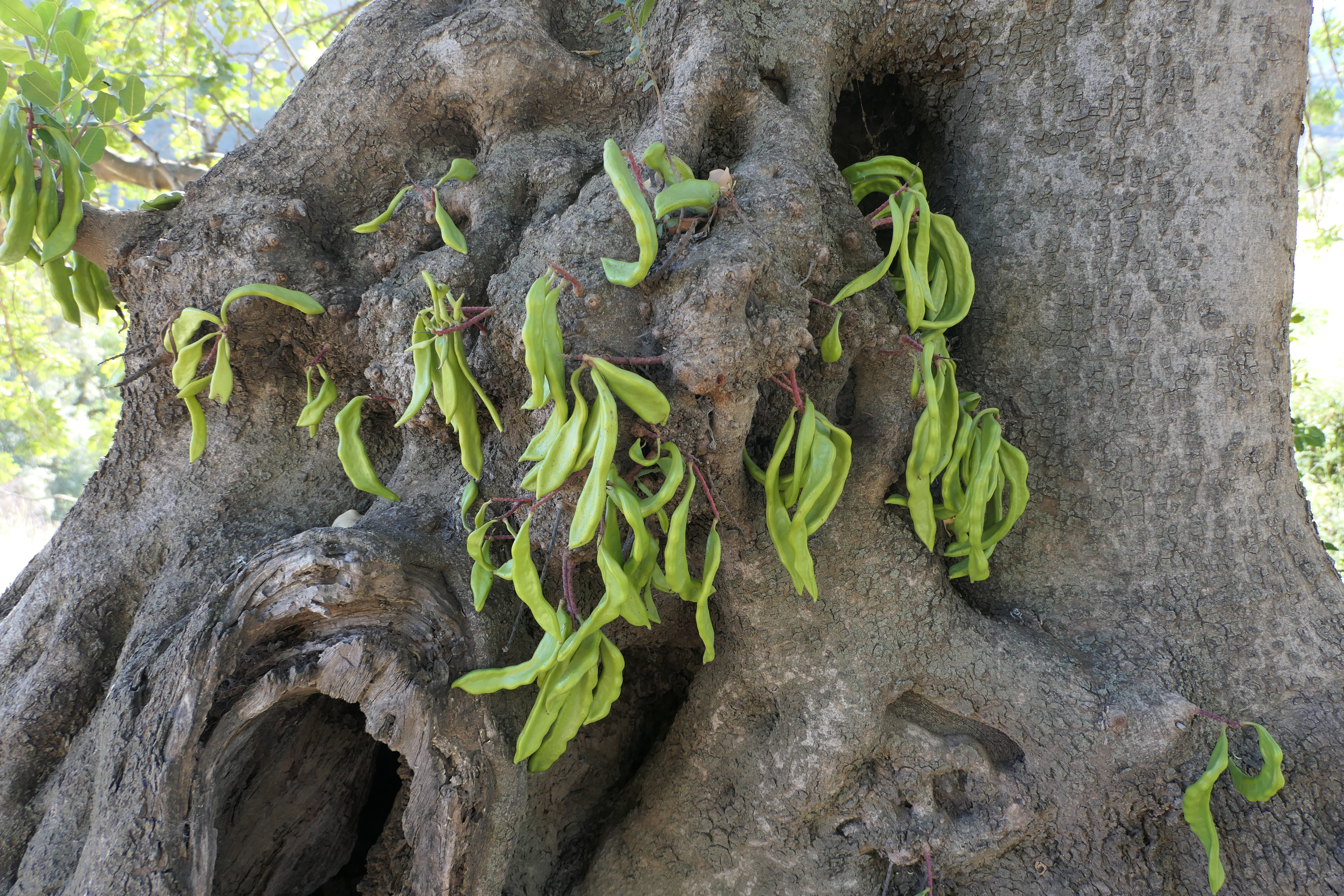
Carob pods growing from trunk (Cauliflory)
