= Phragmacossia ariana =

Scientific classification
- Domain: Eukaryota
- Kingdom: Animalia
- Phylum: Arthropoda
- Class: Insecta
- Order: Lepidoptera
- Family: Cossidae
- Genus: Phragmacossia
- Species: P. ariana

Binomial name
- Phragmacossia ariana (Grum-Grshimailo, 1899)

Synonyms
- Zeuzera (Azygophleps) ariana Grum-Grshimailo, 1899; Phragmatoecia reticulata Pungeler, 1900

Species of moth

Phragmacossia ariana is a species of moth of the family Cossidae. It is found in Uzbekistan, Tajikistan, Turkmenistan, Kyrgyzstan and Iran.
